The following list is a summary of foreign football players, who have played at least one game in the highest level in men's football league system in Poland (1948–2008 I liga, since 2009 Ekstraklasa). Up to now, 104 different federations associated with one of the following: AFC, CAF, CONCACAF, CONMEBOL, OFC or UEFA have been represented in Ekstraklasa.

Players must meet both of the following two criteria:
Have played at least one Ekstraklasa game
Are considered foreign, i.e., outside Poland determined by the following: A player is considered foreign if he is not eligible to play for the national team of Poland

In bold: footballers that play in Ekstraklasa in 2022-23 season, and the clubs they play for.

Afghanistan
Omran Haydary – Lechia Gdańsk (2020-2021)

Albania
Bekim Balaj – Jagiellonia Białystok (2013-2014)
Vullnet Basha – Wisła Kraków (2017-2020)
Edgar Çani – Polonia Warsaw (2011-2012)
Jurgen Çelhaka – Legia Warsaw (2021–)
Enkeleid Dobi – Zagłębie Lubin (2000-2002), Górnik Zabrze (2003)
Afrim Kuci – Siarka Tarnobrzeg (1994)
Ernest Muçi – Legia Warsaw (2021–)
Sebino Plaku – Śląsk Wrocław (2013-2014)
Armando Sadiku – Legia Warsaw (2017)
Juljan Shehu – Widzew Łódź (2022-)
Ervin Skela – Arka Gdynia (2011)

Algeria
Mohammed Rahoui – Lechia Gdańsk (2013)

Angola
Alexander Christovão – Zagłębie Sosnowiec (2018)
Giovanni – Arka Gdynia (2010-2011)

Argentina
Juan Bauzá – Górnik Zabrze (2019)
Ismael Blanco – Legia Warsaw (2012)
Ariel Cabral – Legia Warsaw (2010-2011)
Jerónimo Cacciabue – Miedź Legnica (2022-)
Mauro Cantoro – Wisła Kraków (2001-2008)
Guillermo Coppola – GKS Katowice (1991)
Cristian Omar Díaz – Śląsk Wrocław (2010-2013)
Matías Favano – Lech Poznań (2005), Polonia Warsaw (2005)
Jorge García – Wisła Kraków (1991)
Manuel Pablo García – Legia Warsaw (2003-2004)
Andrés Lioi – Korona Kielce (2019-2020)
Vernon De Marco – Lech Poznań (2017-2019)
Fabio Marozzi – Śląsk Wrocław (1990-1991)
Gervasio Núñez – Wisła Kraków (2011-2012)
Paulo Pérez – Widzew Łódź (2002)
Andrés Ríos – Wisła Kraków (2010-2011)
Germán Darío Rodríguez – Lech Poznań (1991)
Marcelo Süller – Igloopol Dębica (1991)

Armenia
Robert Arzumanyan – Jagiellonia Białystok (2011-2012)
Vahan Bichakhchyan – Pogoń Szczecin (2022-)
Narek Grigoryan – Jagiellonia Białystok (2022)
Levon Hayrapetyan – Lechia Gdańsk (2011-2012), Widzew Łódź (2013)
Aghvan Papikyan – ŁKS Łódź (2011-2012)

Australia
Jacob Burns – Wisła Kraków (2006-2007)
Jordan Courtney-Perkins – Raków Częstochowa (2021-), Warta Poznań (2022)
Labinot Haliti – ŁKS Łódź (2008-2009)
Jake McGing – Wisła Płock (2019)
Michael Thwaite – Wisła Kraków (2006-2007)

Austria
Emir Dilaver – Lech Poznań (2017-2018)
Kevin Friesenbichler – Lechia Gdańsk (2014-2015)
Ronald Gërçaliu – ŁKS Łódź (2012)
Alexander Gorgon – Pogoń Szczecin (2020-)
Sandro Gotal – Piast Gliwice (2016)
Dominik Hofbauer – Arka Gdynia (2016-2017)
Martin Kreuzriegler – Widzew Łódź (2022-)
Constantin Reiner – Piast Gliwice (2022-)
Stefan Savić – Wisła Kraków (2020-2022)
Daniel Sikorski – Górnik Zabrze (2010-2011), Polonia Warsaw (2011-2012), Wisła Kraków (2012-2013)
Alex Sobczyk – Górnik Zabrze (2020-)
Srđan Spiridonović – Pogoń Szczecin (2019-2020)
David Stec – Pogoń Szczecin (2018-2020), Lechia Gdańsk (2022-)
Richard Strebinger – Legia Warsaw (2022)
Dominik Wydra – Raków Częstochowa (2021)
Benedikt Zech – Pogoń Szczecin (2019-)

Azerbaijan
Mahir Emreli – Legia Warsaw (2021)
Anton Krivotsyuk – Wisła Płock (2021-)
Ruslan Məcidov – Widzew Łódź (2006)
Saşa Yunisoğlu – Dyskobolia Grodzisk Wielkopolski (2007-2008)

Belarus
Syarhey Amelyanchuk – Legia Warsaw (2001-2002)
Syarhey Amyalyusik – Motor Lublin (1990)
Alyaksandr Asipovich – Zagłębie Lubin (2001-2002), Polonia Warsaw (2004)
Eduard Baltrushevich – Petro Płock (1999)
Mikalay Branfilaw – Wisła Płock (2003-2004)
Andrey Hlebasolaw – Wisła Kraków (1992)
Ihar Hurynovich – ŁKS Łódź (1993)
Barys Karasyow – Górnik Zabrze (1996)
Uladzimir Klimovich – Stomil Olsztyn (1999), Petro Płock (1999)
Dzmitry Klochek – Raków Częstochowa (1993)
Syarhey Kryvets – Lech Poznań (2010-2012), Wisła Płock (2016-2017), Arka Gdynia (2017-2018)
Uladzimir Lamaka – Górnik Zabrze (1996)
Alyaksandr Lebedzew – Widzew Łódź (2012)
Ivan Maewski – Zawisza Bydgoszcz (2015)
Yury Maleyew – Zawisza Bydgoszcz (1991-1994)
Dzmitry Nazaraw – Zagłębie Lubin (1997)
Aleksandr Pavlovets – Warta Poznań (2022)
Pavel Pavlyuchenko – Bruk-Bet Termalica Nieciecza (2022)
Filip Rudzik – Górnik Łęczna (2015)
Syarhey Saladownikaw – Jagiellonia Białystok (1992)
Pavel Savitski – Jagiellonia Białystok (2015)
Alyaksandr Sazankow – Lechia Gdańsk (2010-2011)
Yevgeniy Shikavka – Korona Kielce (2022-)
Ilya Shkurin – Raków Częstochowa (2022)
Andrey Sinichin – Stomil Olsztyn (1996-1997), Amica Wronki (1999-2001), Polonia Warsaw (2003)
Mikhail Sivakow – Wisła Kraków (2011)
Mikhail Smirnow – Zawisza Bydgoszcz (1992)
Aleh Veratsila – Podbeskidzie Bielsko-Biała (2016)
Dzmitry Verkhawtsow – Korona Kielce (2016)
Syarhey Yasinski – Jagiellonia Białystok (1992)
Yawhen Zhuk – Orlen Płock (2001)

Belgium
Hamza Bahaïd – Miedź Legnica (2022-)
Milan Corryn – Warta Poznań (2021-)
Mehdi Lehaire – Miedź Legnica (2022-)
Vadis Odjidja-Ofoe – Legia Warsaw (2016-2017)

Bosnia and Herzegovina
Admir Adžem – Pogoń Szczecin (2002-2003), GKS Katowice (2003-2004), Zagłębie Sosnowiec (2007)
Ensar Arifović – Polonia Warsaw (2005-2006), ŁKS Łódź (2006-2008), Jagiellonia Białystok (2008-2009)
Tomislav Bašić – Arka Gdynia (2008)
Gordan Bunoza – Wisła Kraków (2010-2014)
Jasmin Burić – Lech Poznań (2009-2019), Zagłębie Lubin (2022-)
Azer Bušuladžić – Arka Gdynia (2019)
Tarik Cerić – ŁKS Łódź (2006-2007)
Miroslav Čovilo – KS Cracovia (2014-2018)
Armin Ćerimagić – Górnik Zabrze (2014-2016)
Željko Đokić – Ruch Chorzów (2011-2013)
Velibor Đurić – Widzew Łódź (2010-2011)
Amar Ferhatović – GKS Bełchatów (2005)
Ognjen Gnjatić – Korona Kielce (2019-2020)
Haris Handžić – Lech Poznań (2009)
Dženan Hošić – Szczakowianka Jaworzno (2003), Zagłębie Sosnowiec (2007-2008)
Zlatko Janjić – Korona Kielce (2018)
Omer Joldić – GKS Bełchatów (2005)
Vlastimir Jovanović – Korona Kielce (2010-2016), Bruk-Bet Termalica Nieciecza (2016-2018, 2021)
Ivan Jukić – Korona Kielce (2017-2019)
Sanel Kapidžić – Korona Kielce (2018)
Elvir Koljić – Lech Poznań (2018)
Adnan Kovačević – Korona Kielce (2017-2020)
Vladan Kovačević – Raków Częstochowa (2021-)
Zvonimir Kožulj – Pogoń Szczecin (2018-2020)
Adi Mehremić – Wisła Kraków (2020-2021)
Muris Mešanović – Bruk-Bet Termalica Nieciecza (2021-2022)
Semjon Milošević – KS Cracovia (2008)
Božo Musa – Miedź Legnica (2019)
Bojan Nastić – Jagiellonia Białystok (2021-)
Amer Osmanagić – Zagłębie Lubin (2010-2011)
Boris Pandža – Górnik Zabrze (2013-2014)
Zvonimir Petrović – Korona Kielce (2022-)
Bojan Puzigaća – KS Cracovia (2011-2012)
Matej Rodin – KS Cracovia (2020-)
Damir Sadiković – KS Cracovia (2020-2022)
Vladimir Sladojević – Górnik Zabrze (2003-2004)
Amir Spahić – Śląsk Wrocław (2009-2013)
Nenad Studen – Wisła Płock (2004-2005)
Asmir Suljić – Zagłębie Lubin (2019)
Edin Šaranović – Pogoń Szczecin (2002)
Semir Štilić – Lech Poznań (2008-2012), Wisła Kraków (2014-2015, 2017), Wisła Płock (2017-2019)
Vule Trivunović – KS Cracovia (2011)
Stojan Vranješ – Lechia Gdańsk (2014-2015), Legia Warsaw (2015-2016), Piast Gliwice (2017)
Sead Zilić – Wisła Płock (2005-2006)

Brazil
Adriano – Pogoń Szczecin (2005)
Hugo Alcântara – Legia Warsaw (2006-2007)
Alexandre – Śląsk Wrocław (2011)
Igor Alves – Widzew Łódź (2011)
Amaral – Pogoń Szczecin (2006-2007)
Edi Andradina – Pogoń Szczecin (2005-2007, 2011-2013), Korona Kielce (2007-2011)
Andreson – ŁKS Łódź (2007-2008)
Ânderson – Lech Poznań (2005-2006), Pogoń Szczecin (2006), Arka Gdynia (2008-2009)
Samuel Araújo – Zawisza Bydgoszcz (2014)
Raphael Augusto – Legia Warsaw (2013-2014)
André Barreto – Wisła Kraków (2005)
Batata – Pogoń Szczecin (2006)
Sérgio Batata – ŁKS Łódź (1997-2000), GKS Katowice (2000), Pogoń Szczecin (2001, 2004-2006), KSZO Ostrowiec Świętokrzyski (2001), Widzew Łódź (2002)
Beto – Wisła Kraków (2009)
Léo Borges – Pogoń Szczecin (2022-)
Brasília – Wisła Kraków (1999-2000, 2003), Pogoń Szczecin (2000-2001), Zagłębie Lubin (2003), Odra Wodzisław Śląski (2010)
Aléx Bruno – Widzew Łódź (2012-2014)
Buba – Pogoń Szczecin (2007)
Daniel Bueno – Odra Wodzisław Śląski (2009-2010)
Campos – Pogoń Szczecin (2007)
Fabinho Capixaba – Pogoń Szczecin (2006)
Rodrigo Carbone – ŁKS Łódź (1997-1998)
Diego Carioca – Jagiellonia Białystok (2022)
Jean Carlos – Wisła Kraków (2019-2021), Pogoń Szczecin (2021-)
Luiz Carlos – Widzew Łódź (2004)
Luís Carlos – Zawisza Bydgoszcz (2013-2014), Korona Kielce (2015), Zagłębie Lubin (2016)
Emerson Carvalho – Widzew Łódź (2013)
Willian César – Pogoń Szczecin (2006)
Thiago Cionek – Jagiellonia Białystok (2008-2011)
Cléber – Wisła Kraków (2006-2010)
Clêison – Pogoń Szczecin (2006)
Conrado – Lechia Gdańsk (2020-)
Fábio Costa – Pogoń Szczecin (2006)
Bruno Coutinho – Jagiellonia Białystok (2008-2010), Polonia Warsaw (2010-2012)
Rafael Crivellaro – Wisła Kraków (2015-2016)
Daniel Cruz – Pogoń Szczecin (2006)
Danilo – Pogoń Szczecin (2006)
Darci – Widzew Łódź (2002-2003)
Deci – Wisła Kraków (1999)
Deleu – Lechia Gdańsk (2010-2014), KS Cracovia (2014-2017)
Dirceu – Korona Kielce (2011)
Douglas – Widzew Łódź (2007)
Otávio Dutra – Pogoń Szczecin (2007)
Edno – Wisła Kraków (2004)
Bruno Eduardo – Widzew Łódź (2003-2004)
Édson – Legia Warsaw (2006-2008), Korona Kielce (2009)
Élton – Pogoń Szczecin (2006-2007)
Élton – Legia Warsaw (2006)
Éverton – Jagiellonia Białystok (2007-2008)
Felipe – Pogoń Szczecin (2007)
Fernando – ŁKS Łódź (1997-1998)
Vinícius Ferreira – KS Cracovia (2018)
Filipe – Górnik Zabrze (2003-2005), Zagłębie Lubin (2006)
Gérson – Lechia Gdańsk (2015-2016, 2018), Górnik Łęczna (2016-2017, 2022)
Gilcimar – Zagłębie Lubin (2005)
Giuliano – Legia Warsaw (2000-2001), Widzew Łódź (2002-2003), Pogoń Szczecin (2004)
Júnior Godoy – Legia Warsaw (2006-2007)
Alison Gu – Pogoń Szczecin (2007)
Guilherme – Legia Warsaw (2014-2017)
Guilherme – Bruk-Bet Termalica Nieciecza (2016-2017), Jagiellonia Białystok (2017-2019)
Roger Guerreiro – Legia Warsaw (2006-2008)
Gustavo – Widzew Łódź (2008)
Guti – Jagiellonia Białystok (2016-2018)
Hebert – Piast Gliwice (2014-2017), Wisła Kraków (2020)
Hermes – Widzew Łódź (2002), Korona Kielce (2005-2008), Jagiellonia Białystok (2008-2011), Zawisza Bydgoszcz (2013-2014)
Hernâni – Górnik Zabrze (2004-2005), Korona Kielce (2005-2010)
Julcimar – ŁKS Łódź (1999), Dyskobolia Grodzisk Wielkopolski (1999), RKS Radomsko (2001), Pogoń Szczecin (2004-2007)
Juliano – Widzew Łódź (2003-2004)
Júnior – Pogoń Szczecin (2006)
Kleyr – ŁKS Łódź (2008)
Kléber – Górnik Zabrze (2006)
Leandrinho – Pogoń Szczecin (2007)
Leândro – Korona Kielce (2014-2015), Górnik Łęczna (2015-2017)
Lélo – Widzew Łódź (2003-2004)
Léo – GKS Katowice (2003)
Lilo – Pogoń Szczecin (2006-2007), Ruch Chorzów (2007)
Élton Lira – Zagłębie Lubin (2012-2013)
Luizão – Radomiak Radom (2022-)
Luquinhas – Legia Warsaw (2019-2021)
Marcelo – Pogoń Szczecin (2007)
Marcelo – Wisła Kraków (2008-2010)
Tiago Martins – Pogoń Szczecin (2007)
Matheus – Pogoń Szczecin (2006)
Maurides – Radomiak Radom (2021-)
Maurício – Legia Warsaw (2018)
Mauro – ŁKS Łódź (1997), Pogoń Szczecin (2004)
Maycon – Jagiellonia Białystok (2010-2011)
Diego Máximo – Pogoń Szczecin (2007)
Mello – Zagłębie Sosnowiec (2018)
Bruno Mezenga – Legia Warsaw (2010-2011)
Mineiro – Pogoń Szczecin (2005-2006)
Henrique Miranda – Lechia Gdańsk (2014)
Rodrigo Moledo – Odra Wodzisław Śląski (2009)
Marcelo Moretto – Arka Gdynia (2011)
Bruno Nazário – Lechia Gdańsk (2014-2015)
Neneca – Pogoń Szczecin (2006)
André Nunes – Zagłębie Lubin (2007)
Dudu Paraíba – Widzew Łódź (2010-2012), Śląsk Wrocław (2013-2016)
Paulinho – Górnik Łęczna (2006)
Paulinho – ŁKS Łódź (2007-2008)
Jean Paulista – Wisła Kraków (2005-2008)
Júnior Paulista – Pogoń Szczecin (2006)
Léo Paulista – Górnik Zabrze (2008)
João Paulo – Górnik Zabrze (2004-2005), KS Cracovia (2005-2006)
Ânderson Pedro – Pogoń Szczecin (2006), Zagłębie Lubin (2007)
Rafael Porcellis – Zawisza Bydgoszcz (2014), Korona Kielce (2015)
Diego Alessandro Rambo – Górnik Zabrze (2004-2005)
Carlos Renan – Zagłębie Lubin (2005)
Rhuan – Radomiak Radom (2021)
Ricardinho – Lechia Gdańsk (2012-2013), Wisła Płock (2018-2019)
Ricardo – ŁKS Łódź (1996-1997)
Rivaldinho – KS Cracovia (2020-2022)
Zé Roberto – Pogoń Szczecin (2006)
Rodnei – Jagiellonia Białystok (2007)
Rodrigo – ŁKS Łódź (1997), Pogoń Szczecin (2004)
Rodrigo – ŁKS Łódź (1997)
Raphael Rossi – Radomiak Radom (2021-)
Sandro – Pogoń Szczecin (2005)
Jô Santos – Radomiak Radom (2022)
Marcelo Sarvas – Polonia Warsaw (2009-2010)
Saulo – ŁKS Łódź (1997)
Leândro da Silva – Pogoń Szczecin (2006)
Thiago – KS Cracovia (2020-)
Thiago Silveira – Pogoń Szczecin (2007)
Thiaguinho – Śląsk Wrocław (2002)
Márcio Tinga – Pogoń Szczecin (2007)
Marco Túlio – Podbeskidzie Bielsko-Biała (2021)
Ulisses – Górnik Zabrze (2005)
Wágner – Zawisza Bydgoszcz (2014)
Wágner – Pogoń Szczecin (2006)
Valdir – Pogoń Szczecin (2006)
Juca Viana – ŁKS Łódź (2008)
Marcus Vinícius – Arka Gdynia (2010-2011, 2016-2017)
Zeferino – Polonia Warsaw (2005)

Bulgaria
Mihail Aleksandrov – Legia Warsaw (2016)
Bozhidar Chorbadzhiyski – Stal Mielec (2020-2022), Widzew Łódź (2022-)
Spas Delev – Pogoń Szczecin (2016-2019)
Kristiyan Dobrev – Lech Poznań (2007)
Diego Ferraresso – KS Cracovia (2016-2021)
Milen Gamakov – Lechia Gdańsk (2016), Ruch Chorzów (2017)
Tsvetan Genkov – Wisła Kraków (2011-2013)
Georgi Hristov – Wisła Kraków (2010)
Dimitar Iliev – Wisła Płock (2016-2017)
Anton Karachanakov – KS Cracovia (2016)
Aleksandar Kolev – Sandecja Nowy Sącz (2017-2018), Arka Gdynia (2018-2019), Raków Częstochowa (2019), Stal Mielec (2021)
Boris Kondev – Wisła Płock (2004)
Plamen Krachunov – Sandecja Nowy Sącz (2017-2018)
Lyubomir Lubenov – Arka Gdynia (2009)
Dimitar Makriev – Górnik Zabrze (2003-2004)
Iliyan Mitsanski – Amica Wronki (2005-2006), Lech Poznań (2006-2007), Korona Kielce (2006, 2017), Odra Wodzisław Śląski (2008), Zagłębie Lubin (2009-2010)
Stoyko Sakaliev – Arka Gdynia (2009-2010)
Simeon Slavchev – Lechia Gdańsk (2016-2018)
Radostin Stanev – Legia Warsaw (2002-2003)
Ivaylo Stoymenov – Górnik Zabrze (2005-2006)
Aleksandar Tonev – Lech Poznań (2011-2013)
Aleksandar Tunchev – Zagłębie Lubin (2012-2013)
Pavel Vidanov – Zagłębie Lubin (2012-2014), Górnik Zabrze (2015-2016)

Burkina Faso
Préjuce Nakoulma – Widzew Łódź (2010-2011), Górnik Zabrze (2011-2014)
Victor Nikiéma – Piast Gliwice (2014)
Moussa Ouattara – Legia Warsaw (2005-2006)
Abdou Razack Traoré – Lechia Gdańsk (2010-2012)

Burundi
Saïdi Ntibazonkiza – KS Cracovia (2010-2014)

Cameroon
Clément Beaud – Widzew Łódź (2002)
Alain Bono – Widzew Łódź (2007)
Serge Branco – Wisła Kraków (2010-2011)
Arnaud Djoum – Lech Poznań (2015)
Donald Djoussé – Pogoń Szczecin (2012-2013)
Develous Ebot – KSZO Ostrowiec Świętokrzyski (1997-1998)
François Endene – Pogoń Szczecin (2005)
Franck Essomba – Jagiellonia Białystok (2010-2011)
Guy Feutchiné – Wisła Kraków (1996-1997)
Ferdinand Chi Fon – Pogoń Szczecin (1999-2002), GKS Katowice (2003), GKS Bełchatów (2005-2006), Górnik Łęczna (2007)
Bleriot Heuyot – Widzew Łódź (1997-1998), Lech Poznań (1998)
Joseph Mawaye – Arka Gdynia (2010-2011)
Ebénézer Mfomou – Stal Mielec (1995)
Moses Molongo – Zagłębie Lubin (1997-2000)
Frankline Mudoh – Legia Warsaw (1998)
Jean Mvondo – Górnik Zabrze (2021-)
Jean Black Ngody – Górnik Zabrze (2000), Stomil Olsztyn (2001)
Arnold Sinju – KSZO Ostrowiec Świętokrzyski (1998)
Hervé Tchami – Pogoń Szczecin (2013)

Canada
Milan Borjan – Korona Kielce (2017)
Charlie Trafford – Korona Kielce (2016)
Kris Twardek – Jagiellonia Białystok (2020-2021)
Steven Vitória – Lechia Gdańsk (2016-2019)

Cape Verde
Jorge Kadú – Zawisza Bydgoszcz (2014)
Hildeberto Pereira – Legia Warsaw (2017)
Lisandro Semedo – Radomiak Radom (2022-)

Chile
César Cortés – Polonia Warsaw (2010)
Ángelo Henríquez – Miedź Legnica (2022-)
Sebastián Rodríguez – Pogoń Szczecin (2002)

China
Dong Fangzhuo – Legia Warsaw (2010)

Colombia
Gustavo Adolfo – Jagiellonia Białystok (2009)
Manuel Arboleda – Zagłębie Lubin (2006-2007), Lech Poznań (2008-2014)
Frank Castañeda – Warta Poznań (2022)
Sergio Reina – Zagłębie Lubin (2010-2012)
Ever Valencia – Wisła Kraków (2017)

Costa Rica
Felicio Brown Forbes – Korona Kielce (2018-2019), Raków Częstochowa (2019-2020), Wisła Kraków (2020-2021)
Júnior Díaz – Wisła Kraków (2008-2012)

Croatia
Mladen Alajbeg – Polonia Warsaw (1999)
Mario Andračić – Górnik Zabrze (2002-2003)
Domagoj Antolić – Legia Warsaw (2018-2020)
Marijan Antolović – Legia Warsaw (2010-2011)
Zoran Arsenić – Wisła Kraków (2017-2018), Jagiellonia Białystok (2019-2020), Raków Częstochowa (2021-)
Andy Bara – Świt Nowy Dwór Mazowiecki (2003)
Josip Barišić – Zawisza Bydgoszcz (2015), Piast Gliwice (2015-2017), Arka Gdynia (2017)
Tomislav Božić – Górnik Łęczna (2014-2016), Wisła Płock (2016-2017), Miedź Legnica (2018-2019)
Petar Brlek – Wisła Kraków (2016-2018)
Frane Čačić – Lechia Gdańsk (2008)
Antonio Čolak – Lechia Gdańsk (2014-2015)
Antonini Čulina – KS Cracovia (2018)
Ivan Ćurić – Podbeskidzie Bielsko-Biała (2012)
Niko Datković – KS Cracovia (2018-2019)
Ivan Fiolić – KS Cracovia (2020-2021)
Dino Gavrić – Widzew Łódź (2013)
Denis Glavina – Arka Gdynia (2010-2011)
Toni Golem – Górnik Łęczna (2006-2007), Ruch Chorzów (2007-2008)
Gordan Golik – Lech Poznań (2009)
Luka Gusić – Jagiellonia Białystok (2012)
Tibor Halilović – Wisła Kraków (2017-2018)
Branko Hucika – Polonia Warsaw (2006)
Kristijan Ipša – Piast Gliwice (2016)
Filip Jazvić – Arka Gdynia (2017)
Josip Juranović – Legia Warsaw (2020-2021)
Slaven Juriša – Górnik Łęczna (2016)
Toni Jurjev – Ruch Chorzów (2002)
Lek Kćira – Górnik Łęczna (2006)
Danijel Klarić – Wisła Kraków (2014)
Marko Kolar – Wisła Kraków (2017-2019), Wisła Płock (2021-)
Grgica Kovač – Orlen Płock (2001)
Matija Kristić – Zagłębie Lubin (2005)
Ivica Križanac – Górnik Zabrze (2002-2003), Dyskobolia Grodzisk Wielkopolski (2003-2004)
Sandro Kulenović – Legia Warsaw (2018-2019)
Damir Kurtović – GKS Katowice (2003)
Mate Lacić – Dyskobolia Grodzisk Wielkopolski (2006-2007), Zagłębie Lubin (2008), GKS Bełchatów (2009-2012)
Danijel Mađarić – Zagłębie Lubin (2004-2005)
Mario Maloča – Lechia Gdańsk (2015-2017, 2019-)
Damir Maretić – Pogoń Szczecin (1999)
Petar Mamić – Podbeskidzie Bielsko-Biała (2021)
Luka Marić – Zawisza Bydgoszcz (2015), Arka Gdynia (2018-2020)
Marko Marić – Lechia Gdańsk (2015-2016)
Stipe Matić – Górnik Zabrze (2006)
Tomislav Mikulić – KS Cracovia (2014)
Antonio Milić – Lech Poznań (2021-)
Mato Miloš – Lechia Gdańsk (2017-2018), Widzew Łódź (2022-)
Dalibor Možanić – Górnik Zabrze (2000)
Karlo Muhar – Lech Poznań (2019-2020)
Matko Perdijić – Ruch Chorzów (2007-2012), KS Cracovia (2014), Zagłębie Sosnowiec (2018)
Oliver Petrak – Korona Kielce (2018-2019)
Anto Petrović – Górnik Łęczna (2005)
Jakov Puljić – Jagiellonia Białystok (2020-2021)
Boris Radovanović – Lechia Gdańsk (2008)
Silvio Rodić – Zagłębie Lubin (2014), Górnik Łęczna (2014-2016)
Marko Roginić – Podbeskidzie Bielsko-Biała (2020-2021)
Ante Rožić – Arka Gdynia (2010-2011)
Dario Rugašević – Piast Gliwice (2017)
Ivan Runje – Jagiellonia Białystok (2016-)
Joško Samardžić – KSZO Ostrowiec Świętokrzyski (2003)
Eduardo da Silva – Legia Warsaw (2018)
Dante Stipica – Pogoń Szczecin (2019-)
Ronald Šiklić – Dyskobolia Grodzisk Wielkopolski (2003-2004), Odra Wodzisław Śląski (2004), Górnik Łęczna (2004-2005)
Lorenco Šimić – Zagłębie Lubin (2020-2021)
Marko Šimić – GKS Bełchatów (2012)
Nikola Šimić – Pogoń Szczecin (1999)
Žankarlo Šimunić – Polonia Warsaw (2006)
Mario Šitum – Lech Poznań (2017-2018)
Damir Šovšić – Sandecja Nowy Sącz (2018)
Matija Špičić – Wisła Kraków (2017)
Dino Štiglec – Śląsk Wrocław (2019-2022)
Josip Tadić – Lechia Gdańsk (2011)
Fran Tudor – Raków Częstochowa (2020-)
Ivan Turina – Lech Poznań (2008-2009)
Ivan Udarević – Polonia Warsaw (2004-2005), ŁKS Łódź (2007)
Tomislav Višević – Zagłębie Lubin (2006)
Ivica Vrdoljak – Legia Warsaw (2010-2015)
Luka Vučko – Lechia Gdańsk (2011-2012)
Mario Zebić – Korona Kielce (2022-)
Oliver Zelenika – Lechia Gdańsk (2018)
Grga Zlatoper – Legia Warsaw (1935-1936)
Diego Živulić – Śląsk Wrocław (2019-2020)

Curaçao
Jurich Carolina – Miedź Legnica (2022-)
Gino van Kessel – Lechia Gdańsk (2017)

Cyprus
Dossa Júnior – Legia Warsaw (2013-2015)

Czech Republic
Luboš Adamec – Śląsk Wrocław (2014)
Karsten Ayong – Piast Gliwice (2018)
Daniel Bartl – Raków Częstochowa (2019-2021)
Michal Bezpalec – Bruk-Bet Termalica Nieciecza (2021-2022)
Jiří Bílek – Zagłębie Lubin (2012-2014)
Jan Blažek – Podbeskidzie Bielsko-Biała (2014)
Jan Buryán – Piast Gliwice (2012-2013)
Martin Bystroň – Świt Nowy Dwór Mazowiecki (2003)
Vladimír Čáp – Zagłębie Lubin (2005-2006), Śląsk Wrocław (2008-2009)
Erik Daniel – Zagłębie Lubin (2021-2022)
Radek Dejmek – Korona Kielce (2013-2018)
Radek Divecký – Pogoń Szczecin (2005)
Tomáš Dočekal – Piast Gliwice (2012-2014)
Martin Doležal – Zagłębie Lubin (2022-)
Tomáš Došek – Wisła Płock (2006-2007)
Lukáš Droppa – Śląsk Wrocław (2014-2015)
Michal Frydrych – Wisła Kraków (2020-2022)
Marcel Gecov – Śląsk Wrocław (2015-2016)
Patrik Gedeon – Wisła Płock (2006-2007)
Jan Gruber – Odra Wodzisław Śląski (2009)
Marek Hanousek – Widzew Łódź (2022-)
Matěj Hanousek – Wisła Kraków (2021-2022)
Adam Hloušek – Legia Warsaw (2016-2019), Bruk-Bet Termalica Nieciecza (2021)
Jakub Hora – Podbeskidzie Bielsko-Biała (2021)
Jan Hošek – KS Cracovia (2011-2012)
Michal Hubínek – Bruk-Bet Termalica Nieciecza (2021-2022)
Michal Hubník – Legia Warsaw (2011-2012)
Matěj Hybš – Bruk-Bet Termalica Nieciecza (2022)
David Jablonský – KS Cracovia (2019-2020)
Petr Janečko – Odra Wodzisław Śląski (2002)
Tomáš Jirsák – Wisła Kraków (2007-2012)
Jakub Jugas – KS Cracovia (2021-)
David Kalousek – Zagłębie Lubin (2005), Arka Gdynia (2007)
Petr Kaspřák – Pogoń Szczecin (2005)
Lukáš Killar – Polonia Bytom (2009-2011)
Jan Kliment – Wisła Kraków (2021-2022)
Lubor Knapp – Odra Wodzisław Śląski (2006)
David Kobylík – Polonia Bytom (2010-2011)
David Kotrys – Polonia Bytom (2009-2010)
Lukáš Kubáň – Sandecja Nowy Sącz (2017)
Tomáš Kuchař – Pogoń Szczecin (2005)
David Ledecký – Górnik Zabrze (2017-2018)
Marcel Lička – Górnik Zabrze (2004-2005), Dyskobolia Grodzisk Wielkopolski (2006)
Mario Lička – Bruk-Bet Termalica Nieciecza (2015)
Jakub Mareš – Zagłębie Lubin (2018-2019)
Tomáš Michálek – Wisła Płock (2007-2008)
František Metelka – Podbeskidzie Bielsko-Biała (2011)
Radek Mynář – Dyskobolia Grodzisk Wielkopolski (2003-2008), Polonia Warsaw (2008-2012)
Tomáš Necid – Legia Warsaw (2017)
Martin Nešpor – Piast Gliwice (2015-2016), Zagłębie Lubin (2016-2017)
Josef Obajdin – Wisła Płock (2006)
Zdeněk Ondrášek – Wisła Kraków (2016-2018, 2022)
Radek Opršal – Zagłębie Lubin (2004)
Michal Papadopulos – Zagłębie Lubin (2012-2016), Piast Gliwice (2017-2019), Korona Kielce (2019-2020)
Tomáš Pekhart – Legia Warsaw (2020-2022)
Tomáš Pešír – Jagiellonia Białystok (2008)
Tomáš Petrášek – Raków Częstochowa (2019-)
Petr Pokorný – Zagłębie Lubin (2004-2006), Śląsk Wrocław (2008)
Jan Polák – Piast Gliwice (2012-2014)
Martin Pospíšil – Jagiellonia Białystok (2017-)
Tomáš Poznar – Bruk-Bet Termalica Nieciecza (2022)
Tomáš Přikryl – Jagiellonia Białystok (2019-)
Daniel Rygel – Odra Wodzisław Śląski (2007-2009)
Radim Sáblík – Odra Wodzisław Śląski (2002-2003), Dyskobolia Grodzisk Wielkopolski (2004-2006)
Ivo Schmucker – Szczakowianka Jaworzno (2002-2003)
Petr Schwarz – Raków Częstochowa (2019-2021), Śląsk Wrocław (2021-)
Lumír Sedláček – Dyskobolia Grodzisk Wielkopolski (2003-2005), Wisła Płock (2006-2007), Piast Gliwice (2008-2010)
Martin Sus – Stal Mielec (2020)
Jan Sýkora – Lech Poznań (2020-2021)
Jaromír Šimr – Amica Wronki (2005-2006)
Ondřej Šourek – Podbeskidzie Bielsko-Biała (2011-2012)
Pavel Šultes – Polonia Warsaw (2011-2012), Ruch Chorzów (2012-2013)
Kamil Vacek – Piast Gliwice (2015-2016), Śląsk Wrocław (2017-2018)
Michal Václavík – Zagłębie Lubin (2006-2007), Górnik Zabrze (2008-2009)
Vlastimil Vidlička – Wisła Kraków (2005)
Tomáš Zajíc – Zagłębie Lubin (2021-2022)
Martin Zeman – Bruk-Bet Termalica Nieciecza (2021)

Democratic Republic of the Congo
N'Dayi Kalenga – Pogoń Szczecin (2001)
Jason Lokilo – Górnik Łęczna (2021-2022)
Christian Maghoma – Arka Gdynia (2018-2020)
Christopher Oualembo – Lechia Gdańsk (2012-2014)
Joël Tshibamba – Arka Gdynia (2010), Lech Poznań (2010)

Denmark
Nicolai Brock-Madsen – KS Cracovia (2018)
Jan Frederiksen – Wisła Kraków (2012)
Jens Martin Gammelby – Miedź Legnica (2022)
Christian Gytkjær – Lech Poznań (2017-2020)
Mathias Hebo Rasmussen – KS Cracovia (2021-)
Frederik Helstrup – Arka Gdynia (2017-2020)
Mikkel Kirkeskov – Piast Gliwice (2018-2020)
Lasse Nielsen – Lech Poznań (2016-2017)
Nicki Bille Nielsen – Lech Poznań (2016-2017)
Patrick Olsen – Śląsk Wrocław (2022-)
Morten Rasmussen – Pogoń Szczecin (2018)

Dominican Republic
Carlos Julio Martínez – Miedź Legnica (2022-)

Ecuador
Joel Valencia – Piast Gliwice (2017-2019), Legia Warsaw (2020-2021)

Egypt
Ahmed Ghanem Soltan – Legia Warsaw (2005)

England
Tom Hateley – Śląsk Wrocław (2014-2016), Piast Gliwice (2018-)
Eddie Stanford – Legia Warsaw (2004)
D'sean Theobalds – Korona Kielce (2020)
Rashid Yussuff – Arka Gdynia (2016)

Estonia
Ken Kallaste – Górnik Zabrze (2016), Korona Kielce (2016-2019)
Igor Morozov – Polonia Warsaw (2013)
Sergei Mošnikov – Pogoń Szczecin (2012), Górnik Zabrze (2013)
Henrik Ojamaa – Legia Warsaw (2013-2014), Miedź Legnica (2018-2019)
Sergei Pareiko – Wisła Kraków (2011-2013)
Artur Pikk – Miedź Legnica (2018-2019)
Sander Puri – Korona Kielce (2011)
Rauno Sappinen – Piast Gliwice (2022-)
Joonas Tamm – Korona Kielce (2019)
Konstantin Vassiljev – Piast Gliwice (2014-2015, 2017-2018), Jagiellonia Białystok (2015-2017)
Bogdan Vaštšuk – Stal Mielec (2022-)
Sergei Zenjov – KS Cracovia (2017-2018)

Finland
Paulus Arajuuri – Lech Poznań (2014-2016)
Petteri Forsell – Miedź Legnica (2018-2019), Korona Kielce (2020), Stal Mielec (2020-2021)
Albin Granlund – Stal Mielec (2021-2022)
Kasper Hämäläinen – Lech Poznań (2013-2015), Legia Warsaw (2016-2019)
Santeri Hostikka – Pogoń Szczecin (2019-2021)
Robert Ivanov – Warta Poznań (2020-)
Richard Jensen – Górnik Zabrze (2022-)
Benjamin Källman – KS Cracovia (2022-)
Niilo Mäenpää – Warta Poznań (2022-)
Joel Perovuo – Jagiellonia Białystok (2014)
Riku Riski – Widzew Łódź (2011)
Joona Toivio – Bruk-Bet Termalica Nieciecza (2018)

France
Hérold Goulon – Zawisza Bydgoszcz (2013-2014)
Angelo Hugues – Wisła Kraków (2002-2003)
Olivier Kapo – Korona Kielce (2014-2015)
Steve Kapuadi – Wisła Płock (2022-)
Thibault Moulin – Legia Warsaw (2016-2017)
Bryan Nouvier – Raków Częstochowa (2019-2020)
Jayson Papeau – Warta Poznań (2021-2022)
William Rémy – Legia Warsaw (2018-2020)
Vamara Sanogo – Zagłębie Sosnowiec (2018-2019), Legia Warsaw (2020), Górnik Zabrze (2021)
Hugo Vidémont – Wisła Kraków (2017)

Gabon
Éric Mouloungui – Śląsk Wrocław (2013)

Gambia
Kebba Ceesay – Lech Poznań (2012-2013, 2015-2016)
Alasana Manneh – Górnik Zabrze (2019-2022)
Ebrahima Sawaneh – Lech Poznań (2005)

Georgia
Giorgi Alaverdashvili – Zawisza Bydgoszcz (2015)
Vato Arveladze – Korona Kielce (2018-2019)
Soso Chedia – Dyskobolia Grodzisk Wielkopolski (1997)
Lasha Dvali – Śląsk Wrocław (2016), Pogoń Szczecin (2017-2018)
Vladimer Dvalishvili – Polonia Warsaw (2012-2013), Legia Warsaw (2013-2014), Pogoń Szczecin (2015–2016)
Nika Dzalamidze – Widzew Łódź (2011), Jagiellonia Białystok (2012–2015), Górnik Łęczna (2016-2017)
Giorgi Gabedava – Zagłębie Sosnowiec (2019)
Vladimer Gabedava – Dyskobolia Grodzisk Wielkopolski (1997-1998)
Luka Gagnidze – Raków Częstochowa (2022)
Tornike Gaprindashvili – Zagłębie Lubin (2022-)
Merab Gigauri – Jagiellonia Białystok (2011-2012)
Guram Giorbelidze – Zagłębie Lubin (2022-)
Gocha Gujabidze – KSZO Ostrowiec Świętokrzyski (1997)
Gia Guruli – GKS Katowice (1991-1992)
Valerian Gvilia – Górnik Zabrze (2019), Legia Warsaw (2019-2021), Raków Częstochowa (2021-)
Giorgi Ivanishvili – Zagłębie Sosnowiec (2019)
Mamia Jikia – Ruch Chorzów (1997-2002), Amica Wronki (2002-2004), Wisła Płock (2004–2005), ŁKS Łódź (2006)
Gia Jishkariani – GKS Katowice (1992)
Nika Kacharava – Korona Kielce (2017-2018), Lech Poznań (2020)
Otar Kakabadze – KS Cracovia (2021-)
Nika Kvantaliani – Bruk-Bet Termalica Nieciecza (2018)
Nika Kvekveskiri – Lech Poznań (2021-)
Giorgi Merebashvili – Wisła Płock (2016-2021)
Levan Mikadze – Pogoń Szczecin (1997-1998)
Giorgi Popkhadze – Jagiellonia Białystok (2013-2015)
Valeri Qazaishvili – Legia Warsaw (2016-2017)
Lasha Rekhviashvili – Ruch Chorzów (2003)
Zaza Revishvili – GKS Katowice (1992-1993)
Koba Shalamberidze – Odra Wodzisław Śląski (2010)
Davit Skhirtladze – Arka Gdynia (2019-2020)
Mate Tsintsadze – Pogoń Szczecin (2017)
Giorgi Tsitaishvili – Wisła Kraków (2022), Lech Poznań (2022-)
Luka Zarandia – Arka Gdynia (2017-2019), Korona Kielce (2022-)

Germany
Marcos Álvarez – KS Cracovia (2020-)
Makana Baku – Warta Poznań (2021), Legia Warsaw (2022–)
Soufian Benyamina – Pogoń Szczecin (2018-2020)
Kevin Broll – Górnik Zabrze (2022-)
Fabian Burdenski – Wisła Kraków (2013-2014), Korona Kielce (2017)
Ulrich Borowka – Widzew Łódź (1997)
Adam Cichon – Widzew Łódź (2003-2004), Polonia Warsaw (2004-2006)
Christian Clemens – Lechia Gdańsk (2022-)
Thomas Dähne – Wisła Płock (2017-2020)
Mario Engels – Śląsk Wrocław (2016-2017)
Michael Gardawski – Korona Kielce (2017-2020), KS Cracovia (2020)
Michael Heinloth – Zagłębie Sosnowiec (2018-2019)
Yannick Kakoko – Arka Gdynia (2016-2018)
Meik Karwot – Górnik Zabrze (2017), Radomiak Radom (2021-)
Michael Kostka – Miedź Legnica (2022-)
Jonatan Kotzke – Górnik Zabrze (2022-)
Emil Noll – Arka Gdynia (2010-2011), Pogoń Szczecin (2012-2013)
Carsten Nulle – Górnik Zabrze (2006)
Dragan Paljić – Wisła Kraków (2010-2012)
Lukas Podolski – Górnik Zabrze (2021-)
Marco Reich – Jagiellonia Białystok (2009)
Tim Rieder – Śląsk Wrocław (2018)
Lennard Sowah – KS Cracovia (2017)
Marco Terrazzino – Lechia Gdańsk (2021-)
Denis Thomalla – Lech Poznań (2015)
Paul Thomik – Górnik Zabrze (2011-2012)
John Yeboah – Śląsk Wrocław (2022-)

Ghana
Seth Ablade – Polonia Warsaw (2003)
Frank Adu Kwame – Podbeskidzie Bielsko-Biała (2013-2015), Miedź Legnica (2018)
Joseph Aziz – Legia Warsaw (1995), Lechia/Olimpia Gdańsk (1995), Polonia Warsaw (1996-1997)
Ishmael Baidoo – Górnik Zabrze (2019, 2021)
Richmond Boakye – Górnik Zabrze (2021)
Emmanuel Kumah – Wisła Kraków (2019)
Odartey Lamptey – Dyskobolia Grodzisk Wielkopolski (2001-2002)
David Mawutor – Wisła Kraków (2021)
Abdul Aziz Tetteh – Lech Poznań (2015-2017)
Emmanuel Tetteh – Lechia/Olimpia Gdańsk (1995-1996), Polonia Warsaw (1996)
Yaw Yeboah – Wisła Kraków (2020-2021)

Greece
Anestis Argyriou – Zawisza Bydgoszcz (2014)
Mavroudis Bougaidis – Lechia Gdańsk (2014-2015)
Stefanos Evangelou – Górnik Zabrze (2020-2021)
Giorgos Giakoumakis – Górnik Zabrze (2020)
Dimitris Goutas – Lech Poznań (2018-2019)
Alexandros Katranis – Piast Gliwice (2021-)
Michalis Manias – Pogoń Szczecin (2019-2020)
Giannis Masouras – Górnik Zabrze (2020-2021)
Giorgos Mygas – Zagłębie Sosnowiec (2019)
Giannis Mystakidis – Górnik Zabrze (2019)
Giannis Papadopoulos – KS Cracovia (2014)
Giannis Papanikolaou – Raków Częstochowa (2020-)
Achilleas Poungouras – Arka (2018)
Dimitrios Stavropoulos – Warta Poznań (2022-)
Stratos Svarnas – Raków Częstochowa (2022-)
Konstantinos Triantafyllopoulos – Pogoń Szczecin (2019-)
Stavros Vasilantonopoulos – Górnik Zabrze (2020)

Guadeloupe
David Fleurival – Zawisza Bydgoszcz (2014)
Thomas Phibel – Widzew Łódź (2012-2013)

Guatemala
Luis Swisher – Polonia Warsaw (2005)

Guinea
Daouda Camara – Amica Wronki (1996), Dyskobolia Grodzisk Wielkopolski (1999-2002)
Momo Cissé – Wisła Kraków (2022)
Sékou Oumar Dramé – Lech Poznań (1995-1998), Dyskobolia Grodzisk Wielkopolski (1998), Petro Płock (1999)
José Kanté – Górnik Zabrze (2016), Wisła Płock (2016-2018), Legia Warsaw (2018-2020)
Alkhaly Soumah – Stomil Olsztyn (1996)
Fodé Soumah – Amica Wronki (1995-1996)

Guinea-Bissau
Romário Baldé – Lechia Gdańsk (2017)
Jorginho – Wisła Płock (2021-2022)
Rudinilson Silva – Lechia Gdańsk (2015)

Haiti
Wilde-Donald Guerrier – Wisła Kraków (2013-2016)
Kevin Lafrance – Widzew Łódź (2013-2014)
Emmanuel Sarki – Wisła Kraków (2013-2015)

Honduras
Osman Chávez – Wisła Kraków (2010-2013)
Carlo Costly – GKS Bełchatów (2007-2009)
Romell Quioto – Wisła Kraków (2012)

Hungary
András Gosztonyi – Śląsk Wrocław (2016)
Richárd Guzmics – Wisła Kraków (2014-2016)
Ádám Gyurcsó – Pogoń Szczecin (2016-2017)
Dávid Holman – Lech Poznań (2015)
Tamás Kádár – Lech Poznań (2015-2016)
Ákos Kecskés – Bruk-Bet Termalica Nieciecza (2017), Korona Kielce (2018)
Gergő Kocsis – Podbeskidzie Bielsko-Biała (2020-2021)
Tamás Kulcsár – Polonia Warsaw (2009)
Róbert Litauszki – KS Cracovia (2016)
Gergő Lovrencsics – Lech Poznań (2012-2016)
Árpád Majoros – KS Cracovia (2008)
Bence Mervó – Śląsk Wrocław (2016)
Dominik Nagy – Legia Warsaw (2017-2019)
Nemanja Nikolics – Legia Warsaw (2015-2016)
Tibor Szabó – Dyskobolia Grodzisk Wielkopolski (2005-2006)
Mátyás Tajti – Zagłębie Lubin (2020)
Márk Tamás – Śląsk Wrocław (2020-2022)
Roland Varga – Bruk-Bet Termalica Nieciecza (2022)
Gábor Vayer – ŁKS Łódź (2008)
Kristopher Vida – Piast Gliwice (2020-2022)

Iceland
Adam Örn Arnarson – Górnik Zabrze (2019)
Böðvar Böðvarsson – Jagiellonia Białystok (2018-2020)
Daníel Leó Grétarsson – Śląsk Wrocław (2022-)

Indonesia
Egy Maulana – Lechia Gdańsk (2018-2021)

Iran
Farshad Ahmadzadeh – Śląsk Wrocław (2018-2019)

Ireland
Cillian Sheridan – Jagiellonia Białystok (2017-2018), Wisła Płock (2020-2021)

Israel
Joel Abu Hanna – Legia Warsaw (2021-2022), Lechia Gdańsk (2022-)
Mohammed Awaed – Lech Poznań (2020-2021)
Aviram Baruchyan – Polonia Warsaw (2012)
Dudu Biton – Wisła Kraków (2011-2012)
Liran Cohen – Podbeskidzie Bielsko-Biała (2011-2012)
Liad Elmaliach – Podbeskidzie Bielsko-Biała (2012)
Oded Gavish – Śląsk Wrocław (2013-2014)
Dor Hugi – Wisła Kraków (2021-2022)
Tamir Kahlon – KS Cracovia (2011)
Maor Melikson – Wisła Kraków (2011-2012)
Moshe Ohayon – Legia Warsaw (2011)
Alon Turgeman – Wisła Kraków (2020)

Italy
Massimiliano Iezzi – Polonia Warsaw (2005)
Stefano Napoleoni – Widzew Łódź (2006-2008)
Joseph Dayo Oshadogan – Widzew Łódź (2007)
Cristian Pasquato – Legia Warsaw (2017-2018)
Elia Soriano – Korona Kielce (2017-2019)

Ivory Coast
Adriel Ba Loua – Lech Poznań (2021-)
Souleymane Koné – Wisła Kraków (2021)
Boliguibia Ouattara – Korona Kielce (2014)
Abdul Moustapha Ouédraogo – Pogoń Szczecin (2013-2014)

Japan
Takafumi Akahoshi – Pogoń Szczecin (2012-2016)
Koki Hinokio – Stal Mielec (2021-2022), Zagłębie Lubin (2022-)
Jin Izumisawa – Pogoń Szczecin (2019)
Kohei Kato – Podbeskidzie Bielsko-Biała (2015-2016)
Seiya Kitano – Pogoń Szczecin (2016-2017)
Daisuke Matsui – Lechia Gdańsk (2013)
Ryota Morioka – Śląsk Wrocław (2016-2017)
Takuya Murayama – Pogoń Szczecin (2013-2015)
Kimitoshi Nogawa – Górnik Zabrze (2004)
Shohei Okuno – Pogoń Szczecin (2014)
Kanji Okunuki – Górnik Zabrze (2022-)
Takuto Oshima – KS Cracovia (2022-)

Kazakhstan
Abzal Beisebekov – Korona Kielce (2014)
Sergei Khizhnichenko – Korona Kielce (2014)
Georgy Zhukov – Wisła Kraków (2020-2022)

Kyrgyzstan
Edgar Bernhardt – KS Cracovia (2013-2014)
Sergei Nikitin – Pogoń Szczecin (1993-1995)

Kosovo
David Domgjoni – Bruk-Bet Termalica Nieciecza (2022)
Xhevdet Gela – Widzew Łódź (2014)
Shpëtim Hasani – Górnik Łęczna (2014-2015)
Lirim Kastrati – Legia Warsaw (2021-2022)
Florian Loshaj – KS Cracovia (2020-)
Kushtrim Munishi – Zagłębie Lubin (1993)
Suad Sahiti – Wisła Płock (2019-2020)
Veton Tusha – Bruk-Bet Termalica Nieciecza (2022)

Latvia
Aleksandrs Fertovs – Korona Kielce (2015-2016)
Vladislavs Gabovs – Korona Kielce (2015-2017)
Vladislavs Gutkovskis – Bruk-Bet Termalica Nieciecza (2016-2018), Raków Częstochowa (2020-)
Jurijs Hudjakovs – Zagłębie Lubin (1996)
Vladimirs Kamešs – Pogoń Szczecin (2015)
Artūrs Karašausks – Piast Gliwice (2016)
Sergejs Kožans – Lechia Gdańsk (2009-2012)
Oļegs Laizāns – Lechia Gdańsk (2010), ŁKS Łódź (2012)
Artis Lazdiņš – Piast Gliwice (2012-2013)
Ivans Lukjanovs – Lechia Gdańsk (2009-2012)
Vitālijs Maksimenko – Bruk-Bet Termalica Nieciecza (2017-2018)
Mārcis Ošs – Górnik Zabrze (2016)
Andrejs Prohorenkovs – Górnik Zabrze (2001)
Deniss Rakels – Zagłębie Lubin (2011), KS Cracovia (2013–2015, 2018), Lech Poznań (2017)
Artjoms Rudņevs – Lech Poznań (2010-2012)
Roberts Savaļnieks – Jagiellonia Białystok (2014)
Māris Smirnovs – Amica Wronki (2004), Górnik Zabrze (2007–2009)
Pāvels Šteinbors – Górnik Zabrze (2013-2015), Arka Gdynia (2016-2020), Jagiellonia Białystok (2020-2022)
Igors Tarasovs – Jagiellonia Białystok (2015-2016), Śląsk Wrocław (2017-2019)
Kristers Tobers – Lechia Gdańsk (2020-)
Daniils Turkovs – GKS Bełchatów (2014)
Aleksejs Višņakovs – KS Cracovia (2011-2012), Widzew Łódź (2013)
Eduards Višņakovs – Widzew Łódź (2013-2014), Ruch Chorzów (2014-2017)
Jurijs Žigajevs – Widzew Łódź (2011)

Liberia
Peter Wilson – Podbeskidzie Bielsko-Biała (2021)

Lithuania
Vidas Alunderis – Zagłębie Lubin (2005-2008)
Vytautas Andriuškevičius – Lechia Gdańsk (2010-2012)
Dominykas Barauskas – Stal Mielec (2022-)
Džiugas Bartkus – Górnik Łęczna (2016)
Vytautas Černiauskas – Korona Kielce (2014-2015)
Fiodor Černych – Górnik Łęczna (2014-2015), Jagiellonia Białystok (2015-2017, 2020-)
Georgas Freidgeimas – ŁKS Łódź (2008)
Dominykas Galkevičius – Zagłębie Lubin (2011)
Andrius Gedgaudas – Widzew Łódź (2000)
Edvinas Girdvainis – Piast Gliwice (2016-2017)
Valdas Kasparavičius – Jagiellonia Białystok (1989)
Donatas Kazlauskas – Lechia Gdańsk (2015)
Tadas Kijanskas – Jagiellonia Białystok (2010-2011), Korona Kielce (2011-2013)
Marius Kižys – ŁKS Łódź (2007), Górnik Zabrze (2007–2009)
Gintaras Kviliūnas – Jagiellonia Białystok (1989)
Tadas Labukas – Arka Gdynia (2009-2011)
Justas Lasickas – Jagiellonia Białystok (2018)
Povilas Leimonas – Widzew Łódź (2013-2014), Jagiellonia Białystok (2014)
Pavelas Leusas – Orlen Płock (2001)
Vytautas Lukša – Polonia Warsaw (2013)
Povilas Lukšys – Polonia Bytom (2009)
Algis Mackevičius – Jagiellonia Białystok (1989)
Justinas Marazas – Wisła Płock (2019)
Deivydas Matulevičius – Odra Wodzisław Śląski (2009), KS Cracovia (2012)
Gražvydas Mikulėnas – Polonia Warsaw (1997-1998, 2000), GKS Katowice (2000-2001), Wisła Płock (2002-2003), Ruch Chorzów (2007)
Titas Milašius – Wisła Płock (2019)
Arvydas Novikovas – Jagiellonia Białystok (2017-2019), Legia Warsaw (2019-2020)
Paulius Paknys – Korona Kielce (2009)
Mindaugas Panka – Widzew Łódź (2007-2008), Ruch Chorzów (2010-2013)
Tadas Papečkys – Korona Kielce (2007-2009)
Deimantas Petravičius – Zagłębie Lubin (2016)
Robertas Poškus – Widzew Łódź (2000), Polonia Warsaw (2001)
Aidas Preikšaitis – GKS Katowice (1998), Stomil Olsztyn (1998-1999), Wisła Płock (2002-2003), Świt Nowy Dwór Mazowiecki (2004)
Arūnas Pukelevičius – Wisła Kraków (1998)
Tomas Radzinevičius – Odra Wodzisław Śląski (2009)
Nerijus Radžius – Zagłębie Lubin (2000-2003), ŁKS Łódź (2009)
Tomas Ramelis – Stomil Olsztyn (1998-2000)
Evaldas Razulis – Górnik Łęczna (2015)
Andrius Skerla – Korona Kielce (2007-2008), Jagiellonia Białystok (2008-2011)
Marius Skinderis – GKS Bełchatów (1998-1999)
Artūras Steško – Widzew Łódź (2001-2002)
Igoris Steško – Widzew Łódź (2001-2002)
Darvydas Šernas – Widzew Łódź (2010-2011), Zagłębie Lubin (2011-2012)
Dainius Šuliauskas – GKS Bełchatów (1998)
Andrėjus Tereškinas – Stomil Olsztyn (1997)
Nerijus Vasiliauskas – Wisła Płock (2002)
Donatas Vencevičius – Polonia Warsaw (1997-1999)
Raimondas Vilėniškis – Wisła Płock (2002-2004)
Emilijus Zubas – GKS Bełchatów (2013, 2015), Podbeskidzie Bielsko-Biała (2015-2016)
Darius Žutautas – Świt Nowy Dwór Mazowiecki (2003)
Tomas Žvirgždauskas – Polonia Warsaw (1997-2001), Widzew Łódź (2001-2002)

Luxembourg
Chris Philipps – Legia Warsaw (2018)

Mali
Bassekou Diabaté – Lechia Gdańsk (2021-)

Martinique
Bédi Buval – Lechia Gdańsk (2010-2011)
Steeven Langil – Legia Warsaw (2016)

Mauritius
Lindsay Rose – Legia Warsaw (2021-)

Mexico
Enrique Esqueda – Arka Gdynia (2018)
Santiago Naveda – Miedź Legnica (2022-)

Moldova
Vadim Boreț – Dyskobolia Grodzisk Wielkopolski (2005)
Ilie Cebanu – Wisła Kraków (2008-2009)
Alexandru Curtianu – Widzew Łódź (1997)
Anatolie Doroș – Legia Warsaw (2004), Polonia Warsaw (2005), Korona Kielce (2005)
Gheorghe Ovseanicov – KS Cracovia (2010)
Sergiu Secu – Śląsk Wrocław (2000)
Alexandru Suvorov – KS Cracovia (2010-2012)

Montenegro
Boban Aković – Śląsk Wrocław (2001)
Emir Azemović – Raków Częstochowa (2019)
Saša Balić – Zagłębie Lubin (2017-2022), Korona Kielce (2022-)
Veljko Batrović – Widzew Łódź (2012-2014)
Fatos Bećiraj – Wisła Kraków (2020)
Žarko Belada – Wisła Płock (2005-2007)
Vladimir Boljević – KS Cracovia (2011-2014)
Marko Čolaković – Wisła Płock (2005-2006)
Marko Ćetković – Jagiellonia Białystok (2011-2012), Podbeskidzie Bielsko-Biała (2013)
Stefan Denković – Zawisza Bydgoszcz (2015)
Miloš Dragojević – Widzew Łódź (2012-2013)
Veselin Đoković – Pogoń Szczecin (2000-2001), Amica Wronki (2002-2004), Legia Warsaw (2005–2006), Korona Kielce (2006)
Uroš Đuranović – Korona Kielce (2019-2020)
Mladen Kašćelan – ŁKS Łódź (2007-2009, 2011), Jagiellonia Białystok (2010-2011)
Damir Kojašević – Jagiellonia Białystok (2008-2009)
Dušan Lagator – Wisła Płock (2020-2022)
Nemanja Mijušković – Miedź Legnica (2022-)
Željko Mrvaljević – Widzew Łódź (2002)
Stefan Nikolić – Bruk-Bet Termalica Nieciecza (2016)
Dejan Ognjanović – ŁKS Łódź (2008-2009)
Luka Pejović – Jagiellonia Białystok (2011-2012)
Željko Perović – Zagłębie Lubin (2004)
Milan Radulović – GKS Bełchatów (2005)
Filip Raičević – Śląsk Wrocław (2020)
Vukan Savićević – Wisła Kraków (2019-2020)
Ermin Seratlić – Jagiellonia Białystok (2011-2012)
Aleksandar Šćekić – Zagłębie Lubin (2022)
Pavle Velimirović – ŁKS Łódź (2011-2012)
Marko Vešović – Legia Warsaw (2018-2021)
Vladimir Volkov – Lech Poznań (2016)
Nikola Vujadinović – Lech Poznań (2017-2019)

Morocco
Nabil Aankour – Korona Kielce (2014-2018), Arka Gdynia (2018-2020)
Nourdin Boukhari – Wisła Kraków (2010)
El Mehdi Sidqy – Jagiellonia Białystok (2010-2011), Piast Gliwice (2012-2013)

Netherlands
Pelle van Amersfoort – KS Cracovia (2019-2022)
Fred Benson – Lechia Gdańsk (2011)
Koen van der Biezen – KS Cracovia (2011-2012)
Marciano Bruma – Arka Gdynia (2010-2011), Lech Poznań (2011)
Saïd Hamulic – Stal Mielec (2022-)
Mickey van der Hart – Lech Poznań (2019-2022)
Kew Jaliens – Wisła Kraków (2011-2013)
Collins John – Piast Gliwice (2013)
Joeri de Kamps – Lechia Gdańsk (2022-)
Michael Lamey – Wisła Kraków (2011-2012)
Aschraf El Mahdioui – Wisła Kraków (2021)
Elvis Manu – Wisła Kraków (2022)
Luciano Narsingh – Miedź Legnica (2022-)
Fabian Serrarens – Arka Gdynia (2019-2020)
Hesdey Suart – KS Cracovia (2010-2012)
Desley Ubbink – Podbeskidzie Bielsko-Biała (2020-2021)
Marko Vejinović – Arka Gdynia (2019-2020)
Johan Voskamp – Śląsk Wrocław (2011-2012)

New Zealand
Aaran Lines – Ruch Chorzów (2003)
Themistoklis Tzimopoulos – Korona Kielce (2019-2020)

Niger
Abdoulmoumoni Garba – Hutnik Kraków (1997)
Mounkaïla Idé Barkiré – Hutnik Kraków (1997)
Zakari Lambo – Hutnik Kraków (1994-1996)
Amadou Noma – Sokół Tychy (1996)
Moussa Yahaya – Sokół Tychy (1996), Hutnik Kraków (1996), GKS Katowice (2000-2001, 2003), Legia Warsaw (2001-2002)

Nigeria
David Abwo – Zagłębie Lubin (2011-2014)
Ahmed Aliyu – Petro Płock (2000)
Napoleon Amaefule – Polonia Warsaw (2002)
Benson Anih – Świt Nowy Dwór Mazowiecki (2003)
Dondu Avaa – Petro Płock (2000)
Nathaniel Ayanwale – Amica Wronki (1997)
William Bassey – Zagłębie Lubin (1997)
Daniel Chima Chukwu – Legia Warsaw (2017)
Chioma Chimezie – Widzew Łódź (1998, 2000)
Eddy Lord Dombraye – ŁKS Łódź (1998-2000), Stomil Olsztyn (2001)
Emmanuel Ekwueme – Polonia Warsaw (1999-2002), Widzew Łódź (2002), Wisła Płock (2003-2004)
Martins Ekwueme – Polonia Warsaw (2002, 2006), Wisła Kraków (2003-2005), Legia Warsaw (2007–2009), Zagłębie Lubin (2009-2012)
Hugo Enyinnaya – Górnik Zabrze (2005)
Rowland Eresaba – Legia Warsaw (2000)
Austin Hamlet – ŁKS Łódź (1997-2000), Stomil Olsztyn (2000)
Sunday Ibrahim – Wisła Kraków (1998-2003), KSZO Ostrowiec Świętokrzyski (2003), Zagłębie Lubin (2003)
Kelvyn Igwe – Polonia Warsaw (2005)
Kelechi Iheanacho – Wisła Kraków (1999-2000, 2004-2005), Stomil Olsztyn (2001-2002), Widzew Łódź (2007)
Benjamin Imeh – Polonia Warsaw (2004-2005), Arka Gdynia (2005
Maxwell Kalu – Amica Wronki (1997-2001), Widzew Łódź (2001-2002), KSZO Ostrowiec Świętokrzyski (2003), Świt Nowy Dwór Mazowiecki (2003)
Nuruddeen Lawal – Stomil Olsztyn (1998)
Celestine Lazarus – Podbeskidzie Bielsko-Biała (2015)
Abraham Marcus – Radomiak Radom (2022)
Mike Mouzie – Petro Płock (1999-2000)
Justin Nnorom – Lech Poznań (1998-2000)
Charles Nwaogu – Podbeskidzie Bielsko-Biała (2014)
Emeka Obidile – Petro Płock (2000)
Felix Ogbuke – Legia Warsaw (2011)
Princewill Okachi – Widzew Łódź (2011-2014)
Mike Okoro – Amica Wronki (2001)
Sylvester Okosun – ŁKS Łódź (1996)
Emmanuel Olisadebe – Polonia Warsaw (1997-2000)
Dudu Omagbemi – Wisła Kraków (2007-2008)
Temple Omeonu – Wisła Kraków (2004), GKS Bełchatów (2006)
Darlington Omodiagbe – ŁKS Łódź (1998-1999)
Daniel Onyekachi – GKS Katowice (2005)
Ikemefuna Ozuah – Wisła Płock (1999-2000), Wisła Płock (2003)
Abel Salami – Stomil Olsztyn (2000-2002), Szczakowianka Jaworzno (2002-2003)
Jero Shakpoke – Zagłębie Lubin (1998)
Godfrey Stephen – Jagiellonia Białystok (2021)
Junior Torunarigha – Zagłębie Sosnowiec (2018)
Kalu Uche – Wisła Kraków (2001-2005)
Cornelius Udebuluzor – Górnik Zabrze (1996)
Stanley Udenkwor – Polonia Warsaw (2001-2002)
Ugo Ukah – Widzew Łódź (2007-2008, 2010-2012), Jagiellonia Białystok (2012-2014)
Philip Umukoro – Dyskobolia Grodzisk Wielkopolski (2000-2001), GKS Katowice (2001-2002)
Kenneth Zeigbo – Legia Warsaw (1997-1998)

North Macedonia
Stefan Aškovski – Górnik Łęczna (2017)
Aleksandar Bajevski – Górnik Łęczna (2006)
Vlado Danilov – Polonia Warsaw (2003)
Enis Fazlagikj – Wisła Kraków (2022)
Marjan Gerasimovski – Legia Warsaw (2001)
Dejan Iliev – Jagiellonia Białystok (2020)
Filip Ivanovski – Dyskobolia Grodzisk Wielkopolski (2007-2008), Polonia Warsaw (2008-2010)
Mirko Ivanovski – Arka Gdynia (2010-2011)
Tihomir Kostadinov – Piast Gliwice (2022-)
Panče Ḱumbev – Dyskobolia Grodzisk Wielkopolski (2004-2008), Legia Warsaw (2008-2010)
Vlade Lazarevski – Dyskobolia Grodzisk Wielkopolski (2005-2007), Polonia Warsaw (2008-2009)
Borče Manevski – Górnik Łęczna (2006-2007)
Goko Petruševski – Lech Poznań (1998)
Goran Popov – Odra Wodzisław Śląski (2005)
Ostoja Stjepanowiḱ – Wisła Kraków (2013-2015), Śląsk Wrocław (2016-2017)
Aco Stojkov – Górnik Zabrze (2003)
Zlatko Tanevski – Lech Poznań (2007-2010), GKS Bełchatów (2010-2011)
Aleksandar Todorovski – Polonia Warsaw (2011-2013), Zagłębie Lubin (2015-2018)
David Toševski – Górnik Zabrze (2021)
Ivan Tričkovski – Legia Warsaw (2015)
Yani Urdinov – Legia Warsaw (2014)

Norway
Vidar Evensen – Widzew Łódź (2000)
Torgil Gjertsen – Wisła Płock (2020-2021)
Kristoffer Normann Hansen – Widzew Łódź (2022-)
Kenneth Karlsen – Widzew Łódź (2000)
Muhamed Keita – Lech Poznań (2014-2015)
Thomas Rogne – Lech Poznań (2018-2021)
Harmeet Singh – Wisła Płock (2017)
Kristoffer Velde – Lech Poznań (2022-)

Palestine
Alexis Norambuena – Jagiellonia Białystok (2007-2013), GKS Bełchatów (2014)

Panama
Luis Henríquez – Lech Poznań (2007-2015)

Paraguay
Jorge Salinas – Legia Warsaw (2012-2013)

Peru
Josimar Atoche – Górnik Łęczna (2017)
Anderson Cueto – Lech Poznań (2008-2009)
Michael Guevara – Jagiellonia Białystok (2009)
Jhoel Herrera – GKS Bełchatów (2007-2008)
Henry Quinteros – Lech Poznań (2006-2008)
Hernán Rengifo – Lech Poznań (2007-2009)
Willy Rivas – Górnik Zabrze (2008)
Junior Ross – Arka Gdynia (2011)
Alexander Sánchez – GKS Bełchatów (2007)

Portugal
Salvador Agra – Legia Warsaw (2019)
Alvarinho – Zawisza Bydgoszcz (2014-2015), Jagiellonia Białystok (2015-2016), Śląsk Wrocław (2016–2017)
Tiago Alves – Piast Gliwice (2019-2021)
João Amaral – Lech Poznań (2018-2019, 2021-)
Augusto – Śląsk Wrocław (2016-2019)
Cafú – Legia Warsaw (2018-2019)
David Caiado – Zagłębie Lubin (2009)
Carlitos – Wisła Płock (2018)
Manuel Curto – Zagłębie Lubin (2014)
Fernando Dinis – Zagłębie Lubin (2009-2011)
Rui Gomes – Legia Warsaw (2021)
Tiago Gomes – Zagłębie Lubin (2007-2008)
Zé Gomes – Lechia Gdańsk (2020)
Filipe Gonçalves – Śląsk Wrocław (2016)
Alexandre Guedes – Raków Częstochowa (2021)
Ricardo Guima – ŁKS Łódź (2019-2020)
Josué – Legia Warsaw (2021-)
Pedro Justiniano – Radomiak Radom (2022-)
Rafael Lopes – KS Cracovia (2019-2020), Legia Warsaw (2020-2022)
Miguel Luís – Raków Częstochowa (2021), Warta Poznań (2022-)
Luís Machado – Radomiak Radom (2021-)
Nuno Malheiro – Zagłębie Sosnowiec (2018)
Zé Manuel – Wisła Kraków (2017)
Manú – Legia Warsaw (2010-2011)
André Martins – Legia Warsaw (2018-2021)
Luís Mata – Pogoń Szczecin (2020-)
Tiago Matos – Radomiak Radom (2021-)
Iuri Medeiros – Legia Warsaw (2019)
Mica – Zawisza Bydgoszcz (2014-2015)
André Micael – Zawisza Bydgoszcz (2013-2015)
Rui Miguel – Zagłębie Lubin (2007-2008)
Elton Monteiro – Miedź Legnica (2019)
Filipe Nascimento – Radomiak Radom (2021-)
Nené – Jagiellonia Białystok (2022-)
Fábio Nunes – Widzew Łódź (2022-)
João Nunes – Lechia Gdańsk (2016-2019)
Flávio Paixão – Śląsk Wrocław (2014-2015), Lechia Gdańsk (2016-)
Marco Paixão – Śląsk Wrocław (2014-2015), Lechia Gdańsk (2016-2018)
Joel Pereira – Lech Poznań (2021-)
Bruno Pinheiro – Widzew Łódź (2010-2012)
Hélio Pinto – Legia Warsaw (2013-2015)
Tomás Podstawski – Pogoń Szczecin (2018-2021)
Rabiola – Piast Gliwice (2013-2014)
Pedro Rebocho – Lech Poznań (2021-)
Yuri Ribeiro – Legia Warsaw (2021-)
Luís Rocha – Legia Warsaw (2019-2020), KS Cracovia (2021-2022)
Orlando Sá – Legia Warsaw (2014-2015)
Gonçalo Silva – Radomiak Radom (2021-2022)
Joshua Silva – Zawisza Bydgoszcz (2014)
Afonso Sousa – Lech Poznań (2022-)
Fábio Sturgeon – Raków Częstochowa (2021-2022)
Pedro Tiba – Lech Poznań (2018-2022)
Tiago Valente – Lechia Gdańsk (2014)
Bernardo Vasconcelos – Zawisza Bydgoszcz (2013-2014)
Diogo Verdasca – Śląsk Wrocław (2021-)
Pedro Vieira – Raków Częstochowa (2023-)

Puerto Rico
Shawn Barry – Korona Kielce (2017)

Romania
Marcel Băban – Ruch Chorzów (2000)
Florin Bejan – KS Cracovia (2016)
Alexandru Benga – Sandecja Nowy Sącz (2018)
Hristu Chiacu – Wisła Kraków (2006-2007)
Ronaldo Deaconu – Korona Kielce (2022-)
Emilian Dolha – Wisła Kraków (2006-2007), Lech Poznań (2007-2008)
Virgil Ghiță – KS Cracovia (2022-)
Sergiu Hanca – KS Cracovia (2019-)
Gabriel Iancu – Bruk-Bet Termalica Nieciecza (2017-2018)
Gabriel Matei – Górnik Łęczna (2017), Bruk-Bet Termalica Nieciecza (2018)
Paul Pîrvulescu – Wisła Płock (2017)
Cornel Predescu – Zawisza Bydgoszcz (2015)
Cristian Pulhac – Zawisza Bydgoszcz (2015)
Florin Purece – Bruk-Bet Termalica Nieciecza (2018)
Bogdan Racovițan – Raków Częstochowa (2022-)
Mihai Răduț – Lech Poznań (2017-2019)
Cornel Râpă – Pogoń Szczecin (2016-2018), KS Cracovia (2018-)
Deian Sorescu – Raków Częstochowa (2022-)
János Székely – Korona Kielce (2012)
Bogdan Țîru – Jagiellonia Białystok (2020-)
Norbert Varga – Wisła Kraków (2006)

Russia
Pavel Akimov – Legia Warsaw (1927-1930, 1934, 1936)
Yevgeni Bashkirov – Zagłębie Lubin (2020-2021)
Sergei Basov – Śląsk Wrocław (1992-1993)
Soslan Dzhanayev – Miedź Legnica (2019)
Aleksandr Gitselov – Zagłębie Lubin (1991-1992)
Roland Gigolayev – Ruch Chorzów (2014-2015)
Sergei Golyatkin – Polonia Warsaw (2012)
Vladimir Grechnyov – Śląsk Wrocław (1991-1992)
Aleksandr Kanishchev – Legia Warsaw (1991)
Dmitri Klabukov – Zagłębie Lubin (2002-2003)
Vladimir Kobzev – Polonia Warsaw (1993)
Pavel Komolov – GKS Bełchatów (2011, 2014-2015)
Oleg Kononov – Ruch Chorzów (1995)
Igor Lyakhov – Sokół Pniewy (1993)
Sergei Mikhailov – Motor Lublin (1991-1992)
Ramil Mustafaev – Legia Warsaw (2022-)
Roman Oreshchuk – Legia Warsaw (1996)
Vadim Rogovskoy – Zagłębie Lubin (1991-1995), GKS Bełchatów (1996-1997)
Kirill Rybakov – Stomil Olsztyn (1995-1996)
Zaur Sadayev – Lechia Gdańsk (2014), Lech Poznań (2014–2015)
Oleg Salenko – Pogoń Szczecin (2000)
Serder Serderov – KS Cracovia (2018)
Sergei Shestakov – Legia Warsaw (1992-1993)
Sergei Shipovskiy – Hutnik Kraków (1992-1997), Pogoń Szczecin (2000-2002)
Vladislav Sirotov – Zagłębie Lubin (2018-2019)
Timur Zhamaletdinov – Lech Poznań (2019-2020)
Ilya Zhigulyov – Zagłębie Lubin (2021-2022)
Maksim Zinovyev – Śląsk Wrocław (2001)
Aleksey Zverev – Olimpia Poznań (1992)

Scotland
Barry Douglas – Lech Poznań (2013-2015, 2021-)
Ziggy Gordon – Jagiellonia Białystok (2017)

Senegal
Issa Ba – Wisła Kraków (2010)
Pape Samba Ba – Lech Poznań (2005-2006)
Mamadou Baldé – Legia Warsaw (2006-2007)
Idrissa Cissé – Podbeskidzie Bielsko-Biała (2015)
Boubacar Dialiba – KS Cracovia (2014-2016)
Elhadji Pape Diaw – Korona Kielce (2016-2018)
Cheikhou Dieng – Zagłębie Lubin (2022-)
Mouhamadou Traoré – Zagłębie Lubin (2009-2012), Pogoń Szczecin (2012), GKS Bełchatów (2013)
Diemé Yahiya – Polonia Warsaw (2012)

Serbia
Miloš Adamović – Polonia Warsaw (2011)
Danijel Aleksić – Lechia Gdańsk (2014)
Zlatan Alomerović – Korona Kielce (2017-2018), Lechia Gdańsk (2018-2021), Jagiellonia Białystok (2022-)
Miodrag Anđelković – Widzew Łódź (2002-2003)
Filip Bainović – Górnik Zabrze (2019-2021)
Marko Bajić – Górnik Zabrze (2008), Lechia Gdańsk (2009–2012)
Aleksandar Bjelica – Korona Kielce (2019)
Saša Bogunović – Widzew Łódź (2006-2008)
Milan Bosanac – Górnik Polkowice (2003-2004)
Saša Cilinšek – Dyskobolia Grodzisk Wielkopolski (2005)
Đorđe Crnomarković – Lech Poznań (2019-2020), Zagłębie Lubin (2021)
Bojan Čečarić – KS Cracovia (2019), Korona Kielce (2020)
Đorđe Čotra – Polonia Warsaw (2011-2012), Zagłębie Lubin (2013-2017), Śląsk Wrocław (2017-2019)
Dejan Đenić – ŁKS Łódź (2009)
Dušan Đokić – Zagłębie Lubin (2010-2011)
Dejan Dražić – Zagłębie Lubin (2020-2021)
Ivan Đurđević – Lech Poznań (2007-2013)
Aleksandar Gruber – Lech Poznań (1999)
Rudi Gusnić – Legia Warsaw (2002)
Dragan Ilić – Stomil Olsztyn (2002), Górnik Zabrze (2002)
Ivica Iliev – Wisła Kraków (2011-2013)
Dimitrije Injac – Lech Poznań (2007-2014), Polonia Warsaw (2012)
Bojan Isailović – Zagłębie Lubin (2010-2011)
Dejan Janjatović – Bruk-Bet Termalica Nieciecza (2017-2018)
Goran Janković – GKS Bełchatów (2005-2006)
Milan Jovanić – Wisła Kraków (2010-2012)
Marko Jovanović – Zagłębie Lubin (2006)
Marko Jovanović – Wisła Kraków (2011-2013)
Marjan Jugović – Polonia Bytom (2009)
Mile Knežević – Szczakowianka Jaworzno (2002-2003)
Srđa Knežević – Legia Warsaw (2010-2011)
Miloš Kosanović – KS Cracovia (2010-2013)
Aleksandar Kovačević – Lechia Gdańsk (2015-2017), Śląsk Wrocław (2017)
Miloš Krasić – Lechia Gdańsk (2015-2018)
Nikola Kuveljić – Wisła Kraków (2020-2022)
Nikola Leković – Lechia Gdańsk (2014-2015)
Danijel Ljuboja – Legia Warsaw (2011-2013)
Andrija Luković – Raków Częstochowa (2019)
Filip Malbašić – Lechia Gdańsk (2014-2015)
Filip Marković – Śląsk Wrocław (2019-2020)
Neven Marković – Lechia Gdańsk (2015)
Vanja Marković – Korona Kielce (2013-2017)
Alen Melunović – Widzew Łódź (2013)
Nemanja Mihajlović – Arka Gdynia (2020)
Nikola Mijailović – Wisła Kraków (2004-2007), Korona Kielce (2009-2011)
Zoran Mijanović – Legia Warsaw (2003)
Vladimir Milenković – Polonia Bytom (2010)
Nemanja Miletić – Korona Kielce (2019)
Vanja Milinković-Savić – Lechia Gdańsk (2016)
Aleksandar Miljković – Miedź Legnica (2018-2019)
Nikola Mitrović – Wisła Kraków (2018)
Filip Mladenović – Lechia Gdańsk (2018-2020), Legia Warsaw (2020-)
Ognjen Mudrinski – Jagiellonia Białystok (2019)
Veljko Nikitović – Górnik Łęczna (2004-2007, 2014-2016)
Milan Nikolić – Polonia Warsaw (2009-2010)
Jovan Ninković – Ruch Chorzów (2007-2008)
Ajazdin Nuhi – Legia Warsaw (2003)
Milan Obradović – Wisła Płock (2020-2022)
Miroslav Opsenica – ŁKS Łódź (2007)
Aleksandar Pantić – Zagłębie Lubin (2021)
Mitar Peković – Wisła Płock (2005-2007)
Mirko Poledica – Lech Poznań (2003), Legia Warsaw (2004–2005), Pogoń Szczecin (2005)
Marko Poletanović – Jagiellonia Białystok (2018-2019), Raków Częstochowa (2020-2022), Wisła Kraków (2022), Zagłębie Lubin (2022-)
Pavle Popara – Pogoń Szczecin (2014)
Uroš Predić – Orlen Płock (2000-2001)
Aleksandar Prijović – Legia Warsaw (2015-2016)
Andreja Prokić – GKS Bełchatów (2014-2015), Stal Mielec (2020-2021)
Vasilije Prodanović – Polonia Bytom (2009)
Uroš Radaković – Wisła Kraków (2021)
Milan Radin – Korona Kielce (2019-2020)
Branko Radovanović – Wisła Kraków (2006-2007)
Miroslav Radović – Legia Warsaw (2006-2014, 2016-2019)
Branko Rašić – Świt Nowy Dwór Mazowiecki (2004)
Milan Rundić – Podbeskidzie Bielsko-Biała (2020-2021), Raków Częstochowa (2021-)
Vladimir Sandulović – Górnik Łęczna (2006)
Mile Savković – Jagiellonia Białystok (2018-2019)
Aleksandar Sedlar – Piast Gliwice (2016-2019)
Vuk Sotirović – Jagiellonia Białystok (2007-2008, 2011), Śląsk Wrocław (2008-2010)
Sreten Sretenović – Zagłębie Lubin (2007-2009), KS Cracovia (2015)
Dragoljub Srnić – Śląsk Wrocław (2017-2018), ŁKS Łódź (2019-2020)
Alen Stevanović – Wisła Płock (2019)
Nikola Stojiljković – Piast Gliwice (2021)
Andraš Strapak – GKS Katowice (2000)
Stanko Svitlica – Legia Warsaw (2001-2003), Wisła Kraków (2006)
Stefan Šćepović – Jagiellonia Białystok (2019)
Davor Tasić – Świt Nowy Dwór Mazowiecki (2004)
Nemanja Tekijaški – Bruk-Bet Termalica Nieciecza (2021-2022)
Vojo Ubiparip – Lech Poznań (2011-2015), Górnik Łęczna (2016-2017)
Žarko Udovičić – Zagłębie Sosnowiec (2018-2019), Lechia Gdańsk (2019-2021), Raków Częstochowa (2021)
Mićo Vranješ – Dyskobolia Grodzisk Wielkopolski (2004-2005)
Predrag Vujović – Wisła Płock (2005)
Ljubiša Vukelja – Śląsk Wrocław (2011)
Dragomir Vukobratović – Górnik Łęczna (2016)
Aleksandar Vuković – Legia Warsaw (2001-2008)
Nenad Zečević – Widzew Łódź (2006)
Nebojša Živković – Wisła Płock (2005-2006)

Slovakia
Martin Adamec – Jagiellonia Białystok (2019)
Peter Babnič – Dyskobolia Grodzisk Wielkopolski (2007)
Filip Balaj – KS Cracovia (2021-)
Vladimír Balát – Górnik Zabrze (2010)
Juraj Baláž – Polonia Bytom (2009)
Pavol Baláž – Ruch Chorzów (2007-2008)
Martin Baran – Polonia Warsaw (2013), Jagiellonia Białystok (2013–2015)
Miroslav Barčík – Polonia Bytom (2009-2011)
Marek Bažík – Polonia Bytom (2008-2011)
Vladimír Bednár – Zagłębie Sosnowiec (2007-2008)
Lukáš Bielák – Górnik Łęczna (2014-2016)
Miroslav Božok – Arka Gdynia (2010-2011, 2016-2017), GKS Bełchatów (2011-2012), Górnik Łęczna (2014-2015)
Martin Bukata – Piast Gliwice (2016-2018)
Ján Chovanec – Ruch Chorzów (2014)
Martin Chudý – Górnik Zabrze (2019-2021)
Pavol Cicman – Piast Gliwice (2012-2014)
Vladimír Cifranič – Odra Wodzisław Śląski (2004)
Erik Čikoš – Wisła Kraków (2010-2011)
Lukáš Čmelík – Piast Gliwice (2017)
Jakub Čunta – KS Cracovia (2017)
Peter Čvirik – Lechia Gdańsk (2009)
Juraj Dančík – Podbeskidzie Bielsko-Biała (2011-2013)
Róbert Demjan – Podbeskidzie Bielsko-Biała (2011-2016)
Milan Dimun – KS Cracovia (2016-2021)
Miroslav Drobňák – Dyskobolia Grodzisk Wielkopolski (2004)
Ondrej Duda – Legia Warsaw (2014-2016)
Martin Fabuš – Ruch Chorzów (2007-2009)
Ján Fröhlich – GKS Bełchatów (2005)
Michal Gašparík – Górnik Zabrze (2011)
Roman Gergel – Górnik Zabrze (2014-2015), Bruk-Bet Termalica Nieciecza (2016-2018, 2021-2022)
Boris Godál – Zagłębie Lubin (2013)
Miroslav Gono – Wisła Płock (2022-)
Michal Gottwald – Legia Warsaw (2006)
Peter Grajciar – Śląsk Wrocław (2015-2017)
Erik Grendel – Górnik Zabrze (2015, 2017-2018)
Lukáš Greššák – Zagłębie Sosnowiec (2019)
Jakub Grič – Sandecja Nowy Sącz (2018)
Dávid Guba – Bruk-Bet Termalica Nieciecza (2016-2018)
Ľubomír Guldan – Zagłębie Lubin (2013-2020)
Michal Hanek – Polonia Bytom (2010-2011), Zagłębie Lubin (2011)
Ľuboš Hanzel – Jagiellonia Białystok (2013)
Lukáš Haraslín – Lechia Gdańsk (2015-2019)
Ivan Hodúr – Zagłębie Lubin (2012)
Dominik Holec – Raków Częstochowa (2021)
Jakub Holúbek – Piast Gliwice (2019-)
Csaba Horváth – Zagłębie Lubin (2010-2013), Piast Gliwice (2013-2015)
Peter Hricko – Polonia Bytom (2008-2011), Pogoń Szczecin (2012-2013)
Libor Hrdlička – Ruch Chorzów (2016-2017)
Lukáš Hroššo – Zagłębie Sosnowiec (2019), KS Cracovia (2019-)
Tomáš Huk – Piast Gliwice (2019-)
Matej Ižvolt – Piast Gliwice (2012-2014)
Lukáš Janič – Korona Kielce (2010), Podbeskidzie Bielsko-Biała (2015)
Marián Jarabica – KS Cracovia (2010-2011)
Erik Jendrišek – KS Cracovia (2015-2017)
Róbert Jež – Górnik Zabrze (2011, 2014-2015), Polonia Warsaw, (2011-2012), Zagłębie Lubin (2012-2013)
Erik Jirka – Górnik Zabrze (2020)
Martin Juhar – Bruk-Bet Termalica Nieciecza (2015-2016)
Andrej Kadlec – Jagiellonia Białystok (2019-2020)
Ľuboš Kamenár – Śląsk Wrocław (2016-2017)
Marián Kelemen – Śląsk Wrocław (2010-2014), Jagiellonia Białystok (2016-2019)
Kristián Kolčák – Podbeskidzie Bielsko-Biała (2015-2016)
Daniel Kosmeľ – Raków Częstochowa (1998), Ruch Radzionków (2000–2001)
Martin Košťál – Wisła Kraków (2017-2018), Jagiellonia Białystok (2019)
Radoslav Kráľ – Polonia Bytom (2007-2008)
Dušan Kuciak – Legia Warsaw (2011-2015), Lechia Gdańsk (2017-)
Vladimír Kukoľ – Jagiellonia Białystok (2011)
Milan Kvocera – Wisła Płock (2022-)
Miloš Lačný – Śląsk Wrocław (2015)
Filip Lesniak – Wisła Płock (2020-)
Peter Lérant – Wisła Płock (2007)
Filip Lukšík – Odra Wodzisław Śląski (2010)
Jaroslav Machovec – Odra Wodzisław Śląski (2009)
Tomáš Majtán – Górnik Zabrze (2014)
Pavol Masaryk – KS Cracovia (2011)
Róbert Mazáň – Podbeskidzie Bielsko-Biała (2015)
Jaroslav Mihalík – KS Cracovia (2017), Lechia Gdańsk (2019-2020)
Martin Mikovič – Bruk-Bet Termalica Nieciecza (2017-2018)
Patrik Mišák – Bruk-Bet Termalica Nieciecza (2016-2017)
Patrik Mráz – Śląsk Wrocław (2012), Górnik Łęczna (2014–2015), Piast Gliwice (2015-2017), Sandecja Nowy Sącz (2017-2018), Zagłębie Sosnowiec (2018-2019)
Samuel Mráz – Zagłębie Lubin (2020-2021)
Ján Mucha – Legia Warsaw (2006-2010), Bruk-Bet Termalica Nieciecza (2017-2018)
Matej Náther – Podbeskidzie Bielsko-Biała (2011-2012)
Erik Pačinda – Korona Kielce (2019-2020)
Patrik Pavlenda – Górnik Zabrze (2008)
Marek Penksa – Wisła Kraków (2005-2007)
Dušan Perniš – Pogoń Szczecin (2012-2013)
Boris Peškovič – Świt Nowy Dwór Mazowiecki (2004), Pogoń Szczecin (2005–2006), Górnik Zabrze (2007-2008, 2011)
Michal Peškovič – Polonia Bytom (2008-2009), Ruch Chorzów (2011-2013), Podbeskidzie Bielsko-Biała (2014–2015, 2020-2021), Korona Kielce (2016-2017), KS Cracovia (2018-2020)
Jozef Piaček – Podbeskidzie Bielsko-Biała (2016)
Róbert Pich – Śląsk Wrocław (2014-2022), Legia Warsaw (2022–)
Branislav Pindroch – Raków Częstochowa (2020)
Michal Piter-Bučko – Podbeskidzie Bielsko-Biała (2012-2013), Sandecja Nowy Sącz (2017-2018)
František Plach – Piast Gliwice (2018-)
Dalibor Pleva – Bruk-Bet Termalica Nieciecza (2015-2017)
Martin Polaček – Zagłębie Lubin (2015-2017), Podbeskidzie Bielsko-Biała (2020)
Andrej Porázik – Dyskobolia Grodzisk Wielkopolski (2005)
Roman Procházka – Górnik Zabrze (2020-2021)
Matúš Putnocký – Ruch Chorzów (2015-2016), Lech Poznań (2016-2019), Śląsk Wrocław (2019-2022)
Henrich Ravas – Widzew Łódź (2022-)
Dobrivoj Rusov – Piast Gliwice (2015-2017)
Ladislav Rybánsky – Podbeskidzie Bielsko-Biała (2013)
Boris Sekulić – Górnik Zabrze (2019-2020)
Michal Sipľak – KS Cracovia (2017-)
Anton Sloboda – Podbeskidzie Bielsko-Biała (2013-2016)
Roman Sloboda – Zagłębie Lubin (2012)
Pavol Staňo – Polonia Bytom (2007-2008), Jagiellonia Białystok (2008-2009), Korona Kielce (2010–2014), Podbeskidzie Bielsko-Biała (2014-2015), Bruk-Bet Termalica Nieciecza (2015-2016)
Miroslav Stoch – Zagłębie Lubin (2021)
Gábor Straka – Ruch Chorzów (2008-2012)
Ľubomír Šatka – Lech Poznań (2019-)
Peter Šinglár – Wisła Kraków (2008-2010)
Michal Škvarka – Wisła Kraków (2021-2022)
Samuel Štefánik – Podbeskidzie Bielsko-Biała (2016), Bruk-Bet Termalica Nieciecza (2016-2018, 2021-2022)
Martin Šulek – Wisła Płock (2022-)
Dalibor Takáč – Korona Kielce (2022-)
Martin Tóth – Zagłębie Sosnowiec (2019)
Ivan Trabalík – Wisła Kraków (2001-2002)
Ľubomír Tupta – Wisła Kraków (2020)
Alexander Tyč – Amica Wronki (1997)
Rudolf Urban – Piast Gliwice (2013), Podbeskidzie Bielsko-Biała (2013)
Kristián Vallo – Wisła Płock (2021-)
Marcel Vasiľ – Bruk-Bet Termalica Nieciecza (2021)
Blažej Vaščák – Polonia Bytom (2010-2011)
Stanislav Velický – Odra Wodzisław Śląski (2010)
Tomáš Vestenický – KS Cracovia (2016-2017, 2019-2020)
Ján Vlasko – Zagłębie Lubin (2015-2017)
Richard Zajac – Podbeskidzie Bielsko-Biała (2011-2015)
Ján Zápotoka – Lech Poznań (2009-2010)
Adam Zreľák – Warta Poznań (2021-)

Slovenia
Roman Bezjak – Jagiellonia Białystok (2018)
Damjan Bohar – Zagłębie Lubin (2018-2020, 2022-)
Elvis Bratanović – Bruk-Bet Termalica Nieciecza (2016)
Goran Cvijanović – Korona Kielce (2017-2018), Arka Gdynia (2018-2019)
Elvedin Džinić – Zagłębie Lubin (2014)
Rok Elsner – Śląsk Wrocław (2011-2013)
Matic Fink – KS Cracovia (2017-2018)
Marko Grižonič – Wisła Płock (2005-2006)
Erik Janža – Górnik Zabrze (2019-)
Boban Jović – Wisła Kraków (2015-2016), Śląsk Wrocław (2017)
Dejan Kelhar – Legia Warsaw (2011)
Andraž Kirm – Wisła Kraków (2009-2012)
Andrej Komac – Ruch Chorzów (2010-2011)
Uroš Korun – Piast Gliwice (2015-2020)
Denis Kramar – Widzew Łódź (2013)
Blaž Kramer – Legia Warsaw (2022–)
Egzon Kryeziu – Lechia Gdańsk (2020-2022)
Dejan Lazarević – Jagiellonia Białystok (2018)
Amadej Maroša – Górnik Zabrze (2022-)
Žan Medved – Wisła Kraków (2021)
Nemanja Mitrović – Jagiellonia Białystok (2017-2019)
Matej Palčič – Wisła Kraków (2018-2019)
Denis Popović – Wisła Kraków (2015-2017)
Matej Pučko – Korona Kielce (2018-2020)
Rok Sirk – Zagłębie Lubin (2019-2021)
Dalibor Stevanović – Śląsk Wrocław (2012-2014)
Andraž Struna – KS Cracovia (2011-2012)
Matija Širok – Jagiellonia Białystok (2016)
Rok Štraus – KS Cracovia (2011-2014)
Marko Šuler – Legia Warsaw (2012-2013)
Luka Šušnjara – Wisła Płock (2021)
David Tijanić – Raków Częstochowa (2020-2021)
Benjamin Verbič – Legia Warsaw (2022)
Tadej Vidmajer – ŁKS Łódź (2020)
Dejan Vokić – Zagłębie Sosnowiec (2018)
Blaž Vrhovec – Górnik Zabrze (2022-)
Luka Zahović – Pogoń Szczecin (2020-)
Saša Živec – Piast Gliwice (2014-2018), Zagłębie Lubin (2019-)

South Africa
Thabo Cele – Radomiak Radom (2021-)
Daylon Claasen – Lech Poznań (2013-2014)
Ricardo Nunes – Pogoń Szczecin (2014-2020)

South Korea
Kim Min-kyun – Jagiellonia Białystok (2013)

Spain
Dani Abalo – Korona Kielce (2016-2017)
Jonathan de Amo – Widzew Łódź (2013-2014), Miedź Legnica (2018), Stal Mielec (2021), Górnik Łęczna (2022)
Andreu – Polonia Warsaw (2010-2011), Lechia Gdańsk (2012)
Igor Angulo – Górnik Zabrze (2017-2020)
Dani Aquino – Piast Gliwice (2019)
Mikel Arruabarrena – Legia Warsaw (2008)
Iñaki Astiz – Legia Warsaw (2007-2015, 2017-2020)
Jon Aurtenetxe – Miedź Legnica (2022-)
Gerard Badía – Piast Gliwice (2014-2021)
Airam Cabrera – Korona Kielce (2015-2016), KS Cracovia (2018-2019), Wisła Płock (2020-2021)
Juanito Calahorro – Śląsk Wrocław (2014-2015)
Carlitos – Wisła Kraków (2017-2018), Legia Warsaw (2018-2019, 2022-)
Juan Cámara – Miedź Legnica (2018-2019), Jagiellonia Białystok (2019-2020, 2022-)
Chuca – Wisła Kraków (2019-2021), Miedź Legnica (2022-)
Alberto Cifuentes – Piast Gliwice (2014)
Roberto Corral – Korona Kielce (2022-)
Samu Corral – ŁKS Łódź (2020)
Fran Cruz – Miedź Legnica (2018)
Fernando Cuerda – Piast Gliwice (2012)
Julián Cuesta – Wisła Kraków (2017-2018)
Davo – Wisła Płock (2022-)
Iñaki Descarga – Legia Warsaw (2008-2009)
Dioni – Lech Poznań (2018)
Antonio Domínguez – ŁKS Łódź (2020)
Elady – KS Cracovia (2018)
Erik Expósito – Śląsk Wrocław (2019-)
Borja Fernández – Miedź Legnica (2018-2019)
Luis Fernández – Wisła Kraków (2022)
Fernán Ferreiroa – Jagiellonia Białystok (2020-2021)
Jorge Félix – Piast Gliwice (2018-2020, 2022-)
Ángel García – Wisła Płock (2019-2021)
Nando García – Arka Gdynia (2019)
Víctor García – Śląsk Wrocław (2021-)
Iván González – Wisła Kraków (2017)
Marc Gual – Jagiellonia Białystok (2022-)
Iker Guarrotxena – Pogoń Szczecin (2018-2019)
Javi Hernández – Górnik Łęczna (2016-2017), KS Cracovia (2017-2019)
Jesús Imaz – Wisła Kraków (2017-2018), Jagiellonia Białystok (2019-)
Isidoro – Polonia Warsaw (2012)
Jesús Jiménez – Górnik Zabrze (2018-2021)
Josu – Górnik Łęczna (2015)
Álvaro Jurado – Piast Gliwice (2012)
Rubén Jurado – Piast Gliwice (2012-2015), Arka Gdynia (2017-2018)
Nahuel Leiva – Śląsk Wrocław (2022-)
Pol Llonch – Wisła Kraków (2017-2018)
Rubén Lobato – Górnik Łęczna (2022)
Ivi López – Raków Częstochowa (2020-)
Higinio Marín – Górnik Zabrze (2022)
Marquitos – Górnik Łęczna (2016), Miedź Legnica (2018)
Iván Martín – Podbeskidzie Bielsko-Biała (2020)
Carles Martínez – Piast Gliwice (2013-2015)
Iván Márquez – Korona Kielce (2018-2020), KS Cracovia (2020-2021)
Carlos Moros Gracia – ŁKS Łódź (2020)
Miguel Muñoz – Piast Gliwice (2021-)
Nacho Novo – Legia Warsaw (2012)
Koldo Obieta – Miedź Legnica (2022-)
Gerard Oliva – KS Cracovia (2018)
Armiche Ortega – KS Cracovia (2015)
Dani Pacheco – Górnik Zabrze (2022-)
Miguel Palanca – Korona Kielce (2016-2017)
Víctor Pérez – Wisła Kraków (2017)
Pirulo – ŁKS Łódź (2019-2020)
Israel Puerto – Śląsk Wrocław (2019-2021), Jagiellonia Białystok (2021-)
Caye Quintana – Śląsk Wrocław (2021-)
Dani Quintana – Jagiellonia Białystok (2013-2014, 2021)
Dani Ramírez – ŁKS Łódź (2019), Lech Poznań (2020-2022)
Álvaro Rey – Arka Gdynia (2017)
Sito Riera – Śląsk Wrocław (2016-2018)
Julio Rodríguez – Wisła Płock (2021)
Mario Rodríguez – Warta Poznań (2020-2021)
Joan Román – Śląsk Wrocław (2016-2017), Miedź Legnica (2019)
Rubio – KS Cracovia (2019)
Santi Samanes – Arka Gdynia (2020)
Omar Santana – Miedź Legnica (2018-2019)
Jordi Sánchez – Widzew Łódź (2022-)
Álex Serrano – Górnik Łęczna (2021-2022)
Sisi – Lech Poznań (2016)
Ian Soler – Zagłębie Lubin (2021)
Dani Suárez – Górnik Zabrze (2017-2019)
Tito – Legia Warsaw (2008)
Alberto Toril – Piast Gliwice (2021-)
Fran Vélez – Wisła Kraków (2017-2018)

Sweden
Pontus Almqvist – Pogoń Szczecin (2022-)
Nazad Asaad – ŁKS Łódź (2008)
Nicklas Bärkroth – Lech Poznań (2017-2018)
Gustav Berggren – Raków Częstochowa (2022-)
Douglas Bergqvist – Arka Gdynia (2020)
Emil Bergström – Górnik Zabrze (2022-)
Johan Bertilsson – Zagłębie Lubin (2014)
Henrik Castegren – Lechia Gdańsk (2022-)
Joseph Ceesay – Lechia Gdańsk (2021-2022)
Paweł Cibicki – Pogoń Szczecin (2020)
Joseph Colley – Wisła Kraków (2022)
Filip Dagerstål – Lech Poznań (2022-)
Mikael Ishak – Lech Poznań (2020-)
Stefan Jansson – Pogoń Szczecin (1992)
Mattias Johansson – Legia Warsaw (2021-)
Jesper Karlström – Lech Poznań (2021-)
Sebastian Rajalakso – Jagiellonia Białystok (2014)
Sebastian Ring – Wisła Kraków (2022)
Ivo Vazgeč – Śląsk Wrocław (2009)

Switzerland
Roberto Alves – Radomiak Radom (2022-)
Maxime Dominguez – Miedź Legnica (2022-)
Levent Gülen – Miedź Legnica (2022-)
Darko Jevtić – Lech Poznań (2014-2019)
Robin Kamber – Górnik Zabrze (2022-)
João Oliveira – Lechia Gdańsk (2017-2018)

Togo
Austine Igbinosa – Zagłębie Lubin (1998)
Lantame Ouadja – Wisła Kraków (2003)

Tunisia
Hachem Abbès – Widzew Łódź (2011-2013)
Mehdi Ben Dhifallah – Widzew Łódź (2012-2013)
Souheïl Ben Radhia – Widzew Łódź (2010-2012)
Amine Hadj Saïd – Piast Gliwice (2014)

Turkey
Nadir Çiftçi – Pogoń Szczecin (2017)
Enis Destan – Warta Poznań (2022-)
İlkay Durmuş – Lechia Gdańsk (2021-)

Ukraine
Ruslan Babenko – Raków Częstochowa (2019-2020)
Denys Balanyuk – Wisła Kraków (2017-2019)
Vitaliy Balashov – Wisła Kraków (2016)
Dmytro Bashlay – Podbeskidzie Bielsko-Biała (2020-2021)
Andriy Bohdanov – Arka Gdynia (2018)
Bohdan Butko – Lech Poznań (2020)
Oleksandr Chornyavskyi – Zagłębie Lubin (1996)
Andriy Danayev – GKS Bełchatów (1999)
Anatoliy Demyanenko – Widzew Łódź (1991-1992)
Yevhen Demydenko – Zagłębie Lubin (2008)
Oleh Derevinskyi – Wisła Kraków (1991-1993)
Andriy Dombrovskyi – Bruk-Bet Termalica Nieciecza (2022)
Oleksiy Dytyatev – KS Cracovia (2017-2020)
Arsen Grosu – Górnik Zabrze (2022-)
Vitaliy Hemeha – Wisła Płock (2016)
Oleh Horin – Jagiellonia Białystok (2019)
Valeriy Hoshkoderya – Stal Stalowa Wola (1991)
Roman Hryhorchuk – Petrochemia Płock (1995)
Andriy Hryshchenko – Górnik Zabrze (1997), Stomil Olsztyn (1997), Górnik Łęczna (2003-2004), Arka Gdynia (2005-2006)
Lubomyr Ivanskyi – Wisła Płock (2007)
Anton Kanibolotskiy – Miedź Legnica (2018-2019)
Ihor Kharatin – Legia Warsaw (2021-)
Oleksiy Khoblenko – Lech Poznań (2018)
Dmytro Khomchenovskyi – Jagiellonia Białystok (2016-2017)
Vladyslav Kocherhin – Raków Częstochowa (2022-)
Ruslan Kolokolov – Igloopol Dębica (1992)
Yevhen Konoplyanka – KS Cracovia (2022-)
Yevhen Kopyl – Zagłębie Sosnowiec (2007-2008), Zagłębie Lubin (2009)
Ihor Korniyets – Lech Poznań (1992)
Dmytro Koshakov – Amica Wronki (1999), Dyskobolia Grodzisk Wielkopolski (2000–2002)
Volodymyr Kostevych – Lech Poznań (2017-2020)
Volodymyr Koval – Bruk-Bet Termalica Nieciecza (2015-2017)
Vasyl Kravets – Lech Poznań (2020-2021)
Serhiy Krykun – Górnik Łęczna (2021-2022)
Pavlo Ksyonz – Sandecja Nowy Sącz (2018)
Ihor Lysak – ŁKS Łódź (1996)
Vasyl Lytvynenko – Widzew Łódź (2022-)
Kostyantyn Makhnovskyi – ŁKS Łódź (2008), Legia Warsaw (2010)
Yehor Matsenko – Śląsk Wrocław (2022-)
Myroslav Mazur – Jagiellonia Białystok (2021)
Ihor Mihalevskyi – GKS Bełchatów (2009)
Andriy Mikhalchuk – Widzew Łódź (1992-2001)
Mykola Musolitin – Lechia Gdańsk (2021)
Serhiy Myakushko – Podbeskidzie Bielsko-Biała (2020-2021)
Borys Oliynyk – Stal Stalowa Wola (1995), GKS Bełchatów (1995)
Kostyantyn Panin – Amica Wronki (1999-2000)
Kyrylo Petrov – Korona Kielce (2014, 2022-)
Artem Polyarus – Bruk-Bet Termalica Nieciecza (2022)
Artem Putivtsev – Bruk-Bet Termalica Nieciecza (2016-2018, 2021-2022)
Serhiy Pylypchuk – Korona Kielce (2013-2017)
Yevhen Radionov – ŁKS Łódź (2019)
Serhiy Raluchenko – Stal Mielec (1991-1992)
Taras Romanchuk – Jagiellonia Białystok (2014-2018)
Artur Rudko – Lech Poznań (2022-)
Artem Shabanov – Legia Warsaw (2021)
Yuriy Shatalov – Amica Wronki (1995-1998)
Oleksandr Shemetyev – Sokół Tychy (1995)
Serhiy Sherabokov – Polonia Warsaw (1996)
Oleksandr Shevelyukhin – Górnik Zabrze (2012-2017)
Serhiy Shevtsov – Dyskobolia Grodzisk Wielkopolski (2000)
Oleksiy Shlyakotin – Korona Kielce (2012-2014)
Valeriy Sokolenko – Górnik Łęczna (2006-2007), Polonia Bytom (2007-2009)
Denys Sokolovskyi – Pogoń Szczecin (2002)
Oleksandr Spivak – Stal Mielec (1994)
Viktor Suslo – Igloopol Dębica (1992)
Viktor Sydorenko – Hutnik Kraków (1993-1994), Wisła Kraków (1996-1997)
Mykola Sych – Warta Poznań (1993)
Ihor Syvukha – Stal Stalowa Wola (1993)
Volodymyr Tanchyk – Ruch Chorzów (2014), Górnik Łęczna (2015)
Oleksiy Tereshchenko – Stal Mielec (1991-1994), Olimpia Poznań (1994-1995), Dyskobolia Grodzisk Wielkopolski (1997-1998)
Ihor Tyschenko – Śląsk Wrocław (2016)
Vasyl Yatsyshyn – Igloopol Dębica (1991)
Volodymyr Yurchenko – Stal Stalowa Wola (1991-1992)
Serhiy Zaytsev – Pogoń Szczecin (1999)
Roman Zub – Legia Warsaw (1993)

United States
Mike Apple – Petro Płock (1999)
Justin Evans – Petro Płock (1999)
Neil Hlavaty – Jagiellonia Białystok (2009)
Brian Iloski – Legia Warsaw (2018)
Aron Jóhannsson – Lech Poznań (2021)
Kenny Saief – Lechia Gdańsk (2020-2021)
Jeremiah White – GKS Bełchatów (2010)

Uruguay
Pablo Álvarez – Wisła Kraków (2009-2010)
Jean Barrientos – Wisła Kraków (2015)
Guillermo Cotugno – Śląsk Wrocław (2020-2021)
Claudio Milar – ŁKS Łódź (2000), Pogoń Szczecin (2004–2005)
César Silvera – Pogoń Szczecin (2004)
Nico Varela – Wisła Płock (2017-2019)
Rodrigo Zalazar – Korona Kielce (2019-2020)

Uzbekistan
Jasurbek Yaxshiboyev – Legia Warsaw (2021)

Venezuela
Jhon Chancellor – Zagłębie Lubin (2022)
Raúl González – GKS Bełchatów (2012-2013)
Mario Rondón – Radomiak Radom (2021-2022)

Zambia
Derby Makinka – Lech Poznań (1992)
Lubambo Musonda – Śląsk Wrocław (2019-2021)
Noel Sikhosana – Wisła Kraków (1991)

Zimbabwe
Felix Antonio – Sokół Tychy (1997)
Takesure Chinyama – Dyskobolia Grodzisk Wielkopolski (2007), Legia Warsaw (2007–2011)
Dickson Choto – Górnik Zabrze (2001), Pogoń Szczecin (2002), Legia Warsaw (2003-2013)
Herbert Dick – Legia Warsaw (2006-2007)
Edelbert Dinha – Sokół Pniewy (1994), Sokół Tychy (1995)
Dzikamai Gwaze – Górnik Zabrze (2014-2015)
Elasto Kapowezha – Sokół Tychy (1995), Lech Poznań (1996)
Shingi Kawondera – Górnik Zabrze (1999-2002)
Leo Kurauzvione – Legia Warsaw (2004)
Norman Mapeza – Sokół Pniewy (1993-1994)
Clement Matawu – Polonia Bytom (2010-2011)
Prince Matore – Sokół Tychy (1995-1997), Raków Częstochowa (1997-1998)
George Mbwando – Lech Poznań (1996)
Usman Misi – Sokół Pniewy (1994)
Gift Muzadzi – Lech Poznań (1995-1996)
Ndabenkulu Ncube – Jagiellonia Białystok (2010)
George Nechironga – Sokół Pniewy (1995)
Costa Nhamoinesu – Zagłębie Lubin (2009-2013)
John Phiri – Sokół Pniewy (1993-1994), Warta Poznań (1994)

Notes

References

External links

90minut.pl
EU-football.info
National Football Teams 

Expatriate footballers in Poland
Ekstraklasa players
Ekstraklasa
Association football player non-biographical articles